The following is a list of notable deaths in January 2021.

Entries for each day are listed alphabetically by surname. A typical entry lists information in the following sequence:
 Name, age, country of citizenship at birth, subsequent country of citizenship (if applicable), reason for notability, cause of death (if known), and reference.

January 2021

1
Abdul Hakim Al-Taher, 71, Sudanese director and actor, COVID-19.
George Ancona, 91, American photo essayist and illustrator.
Barry Austin, 52, British record holder, nation's heaviest man, heart attack.
Jan de Bie, 74, Dutch painter and photographer.
Dame Margaret Booth, 87, British judge, judge of the High Court of Justice (1979–1994), chair of the Family and Parenting Institute (1999–2004).
Clint Boulton, 72, English footballer (Port Vale, Torquay United).
Colin J. Bushnell, 73, British mathematician.
Carlos do Carmo, 81, Portuguese fado singer ("Uma flor de verde pinho"), ruptured aneurysm.
Ben Chafin, 60, American politician, member of the Virginia House of Delegates (2014) and Senate (since 2014), complications from COVID-19.
Emanuele Chiapasco, 90, Italian baseball player (Milano Baseball Club), sporting director, and entrepreneur.
Simone Chrisostome, 97, French resistance member and Holocaust survivor.
Pierantonio Costa, 81, Italian businessman and diplomat, arranged safe passage during the Rwandan genocide.
Christine Dacera, 23, Filipino flight attendant, ruptured aortic aneurysm.
Carrie Dann, 88, American Western Shoshone indigenous rights activist and spiritual leader.
Paul Delorey, 71, Canadian curler and politician, Northwest Territories MLA (1999–2011).
Traude Dierdorf, 73, Austrian politician, mayor of Wiener Neustadt (1997–2005).
Irene Dixon, 96, British World War II codebreaker.
Ron Dominguez, 85, American theme park executive, vice-president of Walt Disney Attractions (1990–1994).
Zoran Džorlev, 53, Macedonian violinist, complications from COVID-19.
Mark Eden, 92, English actor (Coronation Street, The Top Secret Life of Edgar Briggs, An Adventure in Space and Time), complications from Alzheimer's disease.
Carlos Escudé, 72, Argentine political scientist and author, COVID-19.
Cleonâncio Fonseca, 84, Brazilian politician, deputy (1987–2007).
Seizō Fukumoto, 77, Japanese actor (Nihon no Fixer, New Battles Without Honor and Humanity, The Last Samurai), lung cancer.
George Gerdes, 72, American singer-songwriter and actor (Hidalgo, The Girl with the Dragon Tattoo, L.A. Noire), brain aneurysm.
Dame Elmira Minita Gordon, 90, Belizean educator, psychologist, and politician, governor-general (1981–1993).
Ágúst Herbert Guðmundsson, 53, Icelandic basketball player and coach (Þór Akureyri), motor neurone disease.
Bernard Guignedoux, 73, French football player (Paris Saint-Germain, Monaco) and manager (Valenciennes).
Joanne Head, 90, American politician, member of the New Hampshire House of Representatives (1976–1984).
Pablo Hernández, 80, Colombian Olympic racing cyclist (1964).
Abderrahim Lahjouji, 79, Moroccan construction executive and politician, founder of the Citizens' Forces, complications from COVID-19.
Ishak Pamumbu Lambe, 74, Indonesian pastor (Toraja Church) and politician, senator (2004–2009).
Michele Leber, 82, American journalist (The Post-Crescent).
Floyd Little, 78, American Hall of Fame football player (Syracuse Orange, Denver Broncos), cancer.
Harald Maartmann, 94, Norwegian Olympic cross-country skier (1952).
Georg Maier, 79, German actor (Familie Meier, Irgendwie und Sowieso) and theatre director.
Christian Massé, 69, French writer.
Mohammad-Taqi Mesbah-Yazdi, 85, Iranian Islamic cleric and philosopher, member of the Assembly of Experts (1991–2016).
Misty Morgan, 75, American country music singer (Jack Blanchard & Misty Morgan), cancer.
Muspandi, 45, Indonesian politician, member of the East Kalimantan Regional People's Representative Council (since 2014), COVID-19.
Norma, 74, French comic book artist.
Rosemary Nyerere, 59, Tanzanian politician, MP (2000–2005).
Dhimitër Orgocka, 84, Albanian actor and director, People's Artist, cerebral hemorrhage.
Jean Panisse, 92, French actor (An Angel on Wheels, The Young Wolves, Perched on a Tree), COVID-19.
Paatje Phefferkorn, 98, Indonesian-born Dutch martial artist, COVID-19.
Toabur Rahim, Bangladeshi politician, MP (1973–1976), COVID-19.
Liam Reilly, 65, Irish singer and songwriter (Bagatelle).
Paige Rense, 91, American editor (Architectural Digest), heart disease.
Usama Nadeem Satti, 22, Pakistani student, shot.
Sun Qiaolu, 25, Chinese actress, heart attack.
Thomas Symons, 91, Canadian professor and author, president of Trent University (1961–1972).
Tam Sheung-wai, 86, Hong Kong academic administrator, president of the Open University of Hong Kong (1997–2003).
Felix Tarasenko, 88, Russian mathematician.
Jan Vering, 66, German gospel singer and playwright.
George Whitmore, 89, American mountaineer and conservationist, member of first team to summit El Capitan, complications from COVID-19.

2
Cléber Eduardo Arado, 48, Brazilian footballer (Kyoto Purple Sanga, Coritiba), COVID-19.
Alex Asmasoebrata, 69, Indonesian auto racer and politician, MP (1992–1997).
Mary Catherine Bateson, 81, American writer and cultural anthropologist.
Mirzaq Biqtash, 75, Algerian writer.
Asher Brauner, 74, American actor (B.A.D. Cats, Switchblade Sisters).
Robbins Burling, 94, American anthropologist and sociolinguist.
Lady Mary Colman, 88, English socialite and philanthropist.
Brad Cox, 76, American computer scientist.
Brian Cowan, 58, Scottish actor (Taggart, Family Affairs, River City).
Bahrum Daido, 56, Indonesian politician, MP (2009–2019), COVID-19.
Oleg Danilov, 71, Russian playwright and screenwriter (You Are My Only Love, From Hell to Hell, Give Me Moonlight), COVID-19.
Miquel Ferrer, 89, Spanish footballer (FC Barcelona, CD Condal, Real Oviedo).
Rob Flockhart, 64, Canadian ice hockey player (Vancouver Canucks, Minnesota North Stars), heart attack.
Marco Formentini, 90, Italian politician, deputy (1992–1993), MEP (1994–2004), and mayor of Milan (1993–1997).
Guadalupe Grande, 55, Spanish poet.
Wahid Hamed, 76, Egyptian screenwriter (Terrorism and Kebab, Ma'ali al Wazir, The Yacoubian Building).
P. G. Harlankar, 88, Indian police officer, police commissioner of Bangalore (1983–1986).
Bernadette Isaac-Sibille, 90, French politician, deputy (1988–2002).
Modibo Keita, 78, Malian politician, prime minister (2002, 2015–2017).
Vladimir Korenev, 80, Russian actor (Amphibian Man, Children of Don Quixote, Criminal Talent) and teacher, People's Artist (1998), COVID-19.
Robert Livingston, 87, American Zen Buddhist teacher.
Arsenio Lope Huerta, 77, Spanish politician, mayor of Alcalá de Henares (1983–1987).
Michael McKevitt, 71, Irish republican, founder of Real IRA, cancer.
Ryder Mofokeng, 68, South African football player (Kaizer Chiefs).
Christopher Moore, 80, British DJ and radio presenter (Radio Caroline).
Neelamperoor Madhusoodanan Nair, 84, Indian poet.
Aylin Özmenek, 79, Turkish animator, complications from COVID-19.
W. B. Park, 84, American cartoonist and illustrator, heart failure.
Marek Pivovar, 56, Czech writer and theatre director, complications from COVID-19.
Mike Reese, 42, American politician, member of the Pennsylvania House of Representatives (since 2009), ruptured brain aneurysm following COVID-19.
Don Salls, 101, American football player (Alabama Crimson Tide) and coach (Jacksonville State Gamecocks).
Yuri Saukh, 69, Russian football player (SKA Rostov, CSKA Moscow, Soviet Union national team) and manager.
Buta Singh, 86, Indian politician, minister of home affairs (1986–1989), governor of Bihar (2004–2006), and chairman of NCSC (2007–2010), complications from a cerebral haemorrhage.
Gary Staples, 80, American politician, member of the Mississippi House of Representatives (1988–1992, 2004–2020), cancer.
Aziz Tamoyan, 87, Armenian politician, president of the Yezidi National Union (since 1989).
Subiakto Tjakrawerdaya, 76, Indonesian politician, minister of cooperatives and small business (1993–1998), COVID-19.
Sir Brian Urquhart, 101, British diplomat, under-secretary-general of the United Nations (1971–1985).
Rudolf Vatinyan, 79, Armenian cinematographer (The Tango of Our Childhood).
Kerry Vincent, 75, Australian pastry chef and television personality (Food Network Challenge).
Johannes Wallmann, 90, German theologian, COVID-19.
Paul Westphal, 70, American Hall of Fame basketball player (Boston Celtics, Phoenix Suns) and coach (Sacramento Kings), glioblastoma.
Brian Whitcombe, 86, Welsh rugby union player (Keighley).

3
Tasso Adamopoulos, 76, French violist, COVID-19.
Carlos Aránguiz, 67, Chilean jurist, justice of the Supreme Court (since 2014), pulmonary fibrosis.
David Arnold, 81, American mathematician.
Raúl Baglini, 71, Argentine politician, deputy (1983–1993) and senator (2001–2003).
Lee Breuer, 83, American playwright (The Gospel at Colonus).
Alf Callick, 95, Australian footballer (South Melbourne).
Valentina Chumicheva, 89, Russian Olympic diver (1952, 1956).
Alan Daly, 91, Australian footballer (Melbourne).
Zoe Davison, 60, British horse trainer, cancer.
Eric Jerome Dickey, 59, American author, cancer.
Cornelis Feoh, 57, Indonesian politician, member of the East Nusa Tenggara Regional People's Representative Council (since 2019).
Salvador Franco, Venezuelan Pemon detainee, tuberculosis.
Rosa Giannetta, 75, Italian journalist and sociologist.
Roger Hassenforder, 90, French racing cyclist.
Oyewusi Ibidapo-Obe, 71, Nigerian academic administrator, vice chancellor of the University of Lagos (2000–2007), COVID-19.
Naohiro Ikeda, 80, Japanese volleyball player, Olympic silver medallist (1968), lymphoma.
Shyamji Kanojia, 65, Indian cricketer (Railways).
Rabeya Khatun, 85, Bangladeshi novelist, cardiac arrest.
Dick Kulpa, 67, American cartoonist (Cracked, Weekly World News), cancer.
Renate Lasker-Harpprecht, 96, German Holocaust survivor and journalist.
Shani Mahadevappa, 88, Indian actor (Shankar Guru, Kaviratna Kalidasa, Guru Brahma), complications from COVID-19.
Gerry Marsden, 78, English musician (Gerry and the Pacemakers, The Crowd), heart infection.
Anil Panachooran, 51, Indian lyricist (Arabikkatha, Katha Parayumpol, Marykkundoru Kunjaadu) and poet, cardiac arrest.
Donald Perry Polsky, 92, American architect, COVID-19 and pneumonia.
Werner Rataiczyk, 99, German painter.
George F. Regas, 90, American Episcopal priest, rector of All Saints Episcopal Church (Pasadena) (1967–1995).
James C. Renick, 72, American academic administrator, chancellor of University of Michigan–Dearborn (1993–1999) and North Carolina A&T State University (1999–2006), complications from amyotrophic lateral sclerosis.
Manola Robles, 72, Chilean journalist.
Elena Santiago, 79, Spanish writer.
Barbara Shelley, 88, British actress (Village of the Damned, Dracula: Prince of Darkness, Quatermass and the Pit), complications from COVID-19.
Albert Sweet, 89, American entrepreneur and philanthropist.
Ali Taher, 59, Indonesian politician, MP (1997–1999, since 2014), COVID-19.
Wolfgang Wippermann, 75, German historian.
Ricardo Akinobu Yamauti, 71, Brazilian politician, mayor of Praia Grande (1997–2000), COVID-19.

4
Tom Acker, 90, American baseball player (Cincinnati Redlegs).
Anatoliy Butenko, 82, Ukrainian politician, MP (1990–1994).
Ronnie Burgess, 57, American football player (Green Bay Packers), cardiac arrest.
Judy Cornell, 87, American Olympic swimmer (1952).
Josep Fornas, 96, Spanish editor and politician, member of the Parliament of Catalonia (1980–1984).
Sandra Hutchens, 65, American law enforcement official, sheriff-coroner of Orange County, California (2008–2019), breast cancer.
Lee Heung-kam, 88, Hong Kong actress (Story of the White-Haired Demon Girl, Moonlight Resonance, Can't Buy Me Love).
Franco Loi, 90, Italian poet.
Laurent Mailhot, 89, Canadian historian and writer.
John Muckler, 86, Canadian ice hockey coach (Minnesota North Stars, Edmonton Oilers, Buffalo Sabres) and executive, complications from heart surgery.
Jonas Neubauer, 39, American Tetris player, seven-time world champion, cardiac arrhythmia.
Elias Rahbani, 82, Lebanese lyricist and composer, COVID-19.
Bernard P. Randolph, 87, American general, complications from COVID-19.
Tanya Roberts, 65, American actress (A View to a Kill, Charlie's Angels, That '70s Show), complications from a blood infection.
Guillermo Rodríguez Melgarejo, 77, Argentine Roman Catholic prelate, bishop of San Martín (2003–2018).
Albert Roux, 85, French restaurateur and chef (The Waterside Inn, Le Gavroche).
M. R. Schunker, 96, Indian naval officer, FOCWF (1976–1977), vice chief of the Naval Staff (1980–1982) and director general of the Coast Guard (1982–1984).
Gregory Sierra, 83, American actor (Barney Miller, Sanford and Son, The Other Side of the Wind), cancer.
Antoni Stankiewicz, 85, Polish Roman Catholic prelate, lawyer and theologian, dean of the Tribunal of the Roman Rota (2004–2012).
Butch Stewart, 79, Jamaican hotelier, founder and chairman of Sandals Resorts and Beaches Resorts.
Bambang Suryadi, 52, Indonesian politician, MP (since 2019), COVID-19.
David Thompson, 84, British food manufacturing executive and horse stable owner (Cheveley Park Stud), co-founder of Hillsdown Holdings, renal failure.
Kay Ullrich, 77, Scottish politician, MSP (1999–2003).
Martinus J. G. Veltman, 89, Dutch theoretical physicist, Nobel laureate (1999).
Karl-Heinz Vosgerau, 93, German actor (World on a Wire).

5
Marie Albe, 96, French journalist (Radio France) and actress (Alone in the World, The Horseman on the Roof).
Bonifácio José Tamm de Andrada, 90, Brazilian professor, lawyer and politician, deputy (1979–2019), complications from COVID-19.
Colin Bell, 74, English footballer (Bury, Manchester City, national team).
Jerry Berger, 87, American press agent and journalist (St. Louis Post-Dispatch).
Emilia De Biasi, 62, Italian politician, deputy (2006–2013) and senator (2013–2018).
C. George Boeree, 68, Dutch-born American psychologist.
Brandãozinho, 90, Brazilian footballer (Palmeiras, Celta de Vigo).
Bob Brett, 67, Australian tennis coach, cancer.
Christina Crosby, 67, American scholar and writer, pancreatic cancer.
João Cutileiro, 83, Portuguese sculptor, respiratory failure.
Annasif Døhlen, 90, Norwegian sculptor.
Thereasea Elder, 93, American nurse.
Osian Ellis, 92, Welsh harpist and composer.
Patricia C. Frist, 81, American banker and philanthropist.
Karl Gamma, 93, Swiss Olympic alpine skier (1948).
John Georgiadis, 81, British violinist (London Symphony Orchestra) and conductor (Malaysian Philharmonic Orchestra).
Mluleki George, 72, South African politician, MP (1994–2008), founder of the United Congress, COVID-19.
Vladimir Gerdt, 73, Russian mathematician.
Goldikova, 15, French Hall of Fame racehorse.
Daniel Grau, 72, Venezuelan jazz musician.
James Greene, 89, Northern Irish actor (William and Mary, Johnny English, Empire of the Sun).
András Haán, 74, Hungarian Olympic basketball player (1964) and sailor (1976).
Happy Man Tree,  150, British plane tree, Tree of the Year (2020), cut down.
Robert Heptinstall, 100, British pathologist.
Neil Hopkinson, 63, English Hellenist, myeloma.
Kim Tschang-yeul, 91, South Korean painter.
Tyberii Korponai, 62, Ukrainian football player and manager (Karpaty Lviv, Zakarpattia Uzhhorod, Kremin Kremenchuk).
Don Leppert, 90, American baseball player (Baltimore Orioles).
A. Madhavan, 86, Indian writer.
Vladimír Oplt, 83, Czech politician, senator (1996–2000).
Pat Patrick, 91, American racing team owner (Patrick Racing).
John Richardson, 86, English actor (One Million Years B.C., Black Sunday, Torso), COVID-19.
Moncer Rouissi, 80, Tunisian politician and diplomat, minister of social affairs, culture, vocational training, and education, ambassador to France (2003–2005).
Thelma Shoher Baker, 96, American educator and anthropologist, COVID-19.
Nghlhav Mehtabs Singh, 72, Indian Olympic boxer (1972).
Jim Sperry, 90, American politician, member of the South Dakota House of Representatives (1997–1998), COVID-19.
Telly Tjanggulung, 47, Indonesian politician, regent of Southeast Minahasa (2008–2013).
Anatol Tsitou, 74, Belarusian historian.
Vennelakanti, 63, Indian lyricist (Murali Krishnudu, Gharana Bullodu, Pellaina Kothalo), cardiac arrest.
Pungky Purnomo Wibowo, 52, Indonesian economist, heart attack.
Keliek Wicaksono, 42, Indonesian visual effects artist (212 Warrior), Citra Cup awardee (2018), blood cancer.
William Windham, 94, British Olympic rower (1952).
Mikhail Zhelev, 77, Bulgarian Olympic steeplechaser (1968, 1972).
Joseph Zong Huaide, 100, Chinese Roman Catholic clandestine prelate, bishop of Sanyuan (1987–2003).

6
Jonathan Aldrich, 84, American poet, stroke.
Kenneth Z. Altshuler, 91, American psychiatrist, COVID-19.
Ashli Babbitt, 35, American rioter, shot.
Vladimir Biryukov, 87, Russian politician, governor of Kamchatka Oblast (1991–1996) and Kamchatka Krai (1996–2000).
Mircea Bolba, 59, Romanian football player (Politehnica Timișoara, Bihor Oradea) and manager (Olimpia Satu Mare).
Leonid Bujor, 65, Moldovan politician, deputy (2005–2009) and minister of education (2009–2011), COVID-19.
Alan Burgess, 100, New Zealand cricketer (Canterbury).
Thomas G. Carpenter, 94, American academic administrator, president of the University of North Florida (1969–1980) and University of Memphis (1980–1991).
Mihai Cotorobai, 69, Moldovan politician, deputy (1990–1994), COVID-19.
James Cross, 99, Irish-born British diplomat and kidnapping survivor (October Crisis), COVID-19.
Peter S. Eagleson, 92, American hydrologist.
Nsikak Eduok, 73, Nigerian air force officer, chief of the Air Staff (1993, 1996–1999).
Bobby Few, 85, American jazz pianist.
Eldon Fortie, 79, American football player (BYU Cougars, Edmonton Eskimos).
Donald Frith, 96, American ceramic artist and academic.
Wiesław Glos, 84, Polish Olympic fencer (1960, 1964) and architect.
Edward Gnat, 80, Polish politician, deputy (1985–1989, 1993–1997), COVID-19.
Francis Hammel, 70, French politician, deputy (1997–2002).
Jim Haynes, 87, American-British underground and avant-garde theatre producer, co-founder of the Traverse Theatre and International Times.
Gerald Hiken, 93, American actor (Reds, Car 54, Where Are You?, Invitation to a Gunfighter).
Laurence H. Kedes, 83, American scientist.
Ferdinand Kolarik, 83, Austrian footballer (Admira Wien, national team).
John Land, 82, British Olympic field hockey player (1964), motor neurone disease.
Jack Lihou, 90, Australian cricketer (Queensland).
Danilo Lim, 65, Filipino military officer, chairman of the Metropolitan Manila Development Authority (since 2017), COVID-19.
Alf Lomas, 92, British politician, MEP (1979–1999).
Pag-asa, 28, Filipino Philippine eagle, first to have been bred and hatched in captivity.
Thanasis Papazoglou, 67, Greek footballer (PAS Giannina, national team).
Kate Payne, 63, American nurse and bioethicist.
Gord Renwick, 85, Canadian ice hockey administrator, president of CAHA (1977–1979) and vice-president of IIHF (1986–1994).
Barry Schwartz, 82, American sociologist.
Iulian Șerban, 35, Romanian paracanoeist, world champion (2010, 2011, 2012).
Victor Thulare III, 40, South African royal, king of the Pedi people (since 2020), COVID-19.
Jim Townsend, 83, Irish politician, senator (1993–1997).
Filip Trifonov, 73, Bulgarian actor (The Boy Turns Man, The Hare Census, A Nameless Band).
Antonio Valdes, 91, Mexican actor (Club de Cuervos).
Burt Wilson, 87, American philosopher, writer and jazz musician, COVID-19.

7
María Paula Acevedo Guzmán, 88, Dominican activist, first lady (1965).
Alex Apolinário, 24, Brazilian footballer (Alverca, Cruzeiro), cardiac arrest.
Michael Apted, 79, English film director (Gorillas in the Mist, Coal Miner's Daughter, The World Is Not Enough).
Val Bettin, 97, American actor (The Great Mouse Detective, Aladdin, Shrek).
Jan Blommaert, 59, Belgian sociolinguist and linguistic anthropologist, cancer.
Elanga Buala, 56, Papua New Guinean Olympic runner (1984).
Biserka Cvejić, 97, Serbian opera singer.
Deezer D, 55, American rapper and actor (ER, In the Mix, CB4), heart attack.
Miriam DeCosta-Willis, 86, American educator and civil rights activist.
Ronnie Ellenblum, 68, Israeli geographer and historian, heart failure.
Ian Foreman, 90, Australian footballer (Footscray).
Hussein Bakry Gazzaz, 95, Saudi Arabian cosmetics businessman.
Grant Gondrezick, 57, American basketball player (Phoenix Suns, Los Angeles Clippers, Limoges CSP).
Thomas Gumpert, 68, German actor (Verbotene Liebe, Lindenstraße, Polizeiruf 110).
Connie Hall, 91, American country singer.
John Heilpern, 78, British theatre critic and editor (The Observer, The New York Observer, Vanity Fair), lung cancer.
Valeri Khlevinsky, 77, Russian actor (Big School-Break, Valentin and Valentina, Taxi Blues), People's Artist of Russia (2002).
Taky Kimura, 96, American martial artist.
Wilberforce Kisamba Mugerwa, 75, Ugandan agricultural economist and politician, MP (1980–1985, 1991–2004), COVID-19.
Vladimir Kiselyov, 64, Ukrainian shot putter, Olympic champion (1980).
Tom LaBonge, 67, American politician, member of the Los Angeles City Council (2001–2015), cardiac arrest.
Genival Lacerda, 89, Brazilian forró singer, complications from COVID-19.
Tommy Lasorda, 93, American Hall of Fame baseball manager (Los Angeles Dodgers) and player (Brooklyn Dodgers, Kansas City Athletics), heart failure.
Christopher Little, 79, British literary agent, founder of Christopher Little Literary Agency.
Cassim Louis, 73, Saint Lucian football manager (national team).
Jamie O'Hara, 70, American country musician and songwriter ("Grandpa (Tell Me 'Bout the Good Old Days)", "Older Women"), Grammy winner (1987), cancer.
Guy Péqueux, 78, French painter.
Lonnie Perrin, 68, American football player (Denver Broncos, Chicago Bears, Washington Redskins).
Marion Ramsey, 73, American actress (Police Academy, Return to Babylon, Lavalantula) and singer.
Carlos Rasch, 88, Brazilian science fiction author.
Norberto James Rawlings, 75, Dominican poet, complications from Parkinson's disease.
Adebayo Salami, 69, Nigerian politician, senator (1999–2003).
Munira Yamin Satti, Pakistani politician, Punjab MPA (since 2018), COVID-19.
Henri Schwery, 88, Swiss Roman Catholic cardinal, bishop of Sion (1977–1995).
Neil Sheehan, 84, American journalist (The New York Times), Pulitzer Prize winner (1989), complications from Parkinson's disease.
Brian Sicknick, 42, American police officer (U.S. Capitol Police).
Solange, 69, Italian psychic and television personality.
Reynaldo Umali, 63, Filipino politician, member of the House of Representatives (2010–2019), COVID-19.
Mel Weitsman, 91, American Buddhist priest, founder of the Berkeley Zen Center.

8
Paul Amargier, 96, French historian and Roman Catholic priest.
Cástor Oswaldo Azuaje Pérez, 69, Venezuelan Roman Catholic prelate, bishop of Trujillo (since 2012), COVID-19.
Eva Badura-Skoda, 91, Austrian musicologist.
William H. Barbour Jr., 79, American jurist, judge (since 1983) and chief judge (1989–1996) of the U.S. District Court for Southern Mississippi.
Harold Bornstein, 73, American gastroenterologist.
Eve Branson, 96, British philanthropist and child welfare advocate, COVID-19.
Ed Bruce, 81, American singer-songwriter ("Mammas Don't Let Your Babies Grow Up to Be Cowboys", "You're the Best Break This Old Heart Ever Had") and actor (Bret Maverick).
David Buchsbaum, 91, American mathematician, heart failure.
Steve Carver, 75, American film director (Lone Wolf McQuade, Big Bad Mama, Capone), complications from COVID-19.
John Corcoran, 83, American logician and philosopher.
David Darling, 79, American cellist and composer.
Květa Eretová, 94, Czech chess grandmaster.
Michael Fonfara, 74, Canadian keyboardist (The Electric Flag, Downchild Blues Band, Rhinoceros), cancer.
Marissa Garrido, 94, Mexican telenovela writer (La Leona), complications from COVID-19.
Otto Geisert, 81, German footballer (Karlsruhe, Kaiserslautern).
Emile Hemmen, 97, Luxembourgian novelist and poet, member of the Luxembourgish Patriot League resistance.
Steve Hendrickson, 54, American football player (San Francisco 49ers, San Diego Chargers, Houston Oilers).
Mike Henry, 84, American football player (Pittsburgh Steelers) and actor (Smokey and the Bandit, Tarzan and the Valley of Gold), Parkinson's disease and chronic traumatic encephalopathy.
Peter W. Huber, 68, American lawyer and writer.
Seth Abid Hussain, 85, Pakistani businessman and philanthropist.
Norm Jary, 91, Canadian politician, mayor of Guelph (1970–1985).
Werner Klumpp, 92, German politician, minister-president of the Saarland (1979).
Barbara Köhler, 61, German poet.
Marian Kondratowicz, 79, Polish footballer (Odra Opole).
Steve Lightle, 61, American comic book artist (Legion of Super-Heroes, Doom Patrol, The Flash), complications from COVID-19.
Colin McDonald, 92, Australian cricketer (Victoria, national team).
Jay W. McGee, 71, American-Canadian musician, complications from COVID-19.
Stewart McKnight, 85, New Zealand cricketer (Otago) and curler.
José Méndez, 83, Spanish Olympic rower (1960).
Diana Millay, 85, American actress (Street of Sinners, Dark Shadows, The Secret Storm).
Dorine Mokha, 31, Congolese dancer, malaria.
Samuel L. Myers Sr., 101, American economist and educationist, president of Bowie State University (1968–1977).
Bill Nankeville, 95, British Olympic runner (1948, 1952).
Oleg Negrobov, 79, Russian entomologist.
Ivo Niederle, 91, Czech actor.
Folabi Olumide, 81, Nigerian academic, vice-chancellor of Lagos State University (1983–1988).
Wojciech Przybylski, 81, Polish football player (Broń Radom) and manager (Lechia Gdańsk, Al-Jaish).
Deborah Rhode, 68, American legal scholar.
Don Robertson, 92, American television announcer (CBS Sports).
Grace Robertson, 90, British photographer.
Michael Shaw, Baron Shaw of Northstead, 100, British politician and life peer, MP (1960–1964, 1966–1992).
Rajkumar Jhalajit Singh, 96, Indian historian.
Pamela Joy Spry, 96, Australian nurse.
Igor Tõnurist, 73, Estonian ethnographer and folklorist.
Vladimir Tretyakov, 84, Russian mathematician, rector (1993–2006) and president (since 2006) of Ural State University.
Iancu Țucărman, 98, Romanian Holocaust survivor, COVID-19.
Katharine Whitehorn, 92, English journalist (The Observer), complications from Alzheimer's disease.
Shirley Wilson, 95, American football coach (Elon Phoenix, Duke Blue Devils).
Xu Qinxian, 85, Chinese military officer and political dissident, choking.
Zoffany, 12, Irish racehorse and sire, liver failure.

9
Beddu Amang, 84, Indonesian economist, chairman of State Logistics Agency (1995–1998).
Mehdi Attar-Ashrafi, 72, Iranian Olympic weightlifter (1976).
Kenneth Barker, 86, British academic administrator, vice-chancellor of De Montfort University (1992–1999) and Thames Valley University (1999–2003).
Harry Brüll, 85, Dutch footballer (Rapid JC Heerlen, Fortuna Sittard, national team).
Antón Cancelas, 65, Spanish voice actor.
Jerry Douglas, 85, American director and writer.
František Filip, 90, Czech film director (Tři chlapi v chalupě, Chalupáři, Utrpení mladého Boháčka), COVID-19.
Patrick Gordon-Duff-Pennington, 90, British farmer and landowner (Muncaster Castle).
Mohamud Mohammed Hassan, 24, British security guard.
Barbara Hewson, 59, Irish barrister, pancreatic cancer.
Isaak Khalatnikov, 101, Russian physicist (BKL singularity).
Vivalyn Latty-Scott, 82, Jamaican cricketer (national team, West Indies team) and coach.
Howard Liebengood, American police officer (U.S. Capitol Police), suicide.
John Lutz, 81, American mystery writer (SWF Seeks Same), complications of Lewy body dementia, Parkinson's disease, and COVID-19.
Ved Mehta, 86, Indian novelist, complications from Parkinson's disease.
Ken Middleditch, 95, British motorcycle speedway rider (Hastings Saxons, Poole Pirates, Swindon Robins).
Johnson Mlambo, 80, South African political activist, complications from COVID-19.
Anatolii Mokrousov, 77, Ukrainian politician, MP (1990–2006), COVID-19.
Margaret Morrison, 66, Canadian philosopher of science, cancer.
Ezra Nawi, 69, Israeli human rights activist, cancer.
Hans Frede Nielsen, 77, Danish philologist.
John Reilly, 86, American actor (General Hospital, Sunset Beach, Passions), heart attack.
Llorenç Rifé, 82, Spanish football player (Barcelona, Deportivo de La Coruña).
George Robertson, 93, Canadian ice hockey player (Montreal Canadiens), COVID-19.
Rong Zi, 98, Chinese-Taiwanese writer and poet.
John Joseph Ryba, 91, American politician, member of the Wisconsin State Assembly (1993–2003).
Ken Sedd, 81, British television actor (The Benny Hill Show, Doctor Who, Z-Cars).
Philip Seeman, 86, Canadian neuropharmacologist, muscle disease.
Kathy Shaidle, 56, Canadian writer, cancer.
Fabrizio Soccorsi, 78, Italian physician, Papal private doctor (since 2015), complications from cancer and COVID-19.
Madhav Singh Solanki, 93, Indian politician, chief minister of Gujarat (1976–1977) and minister of External Affairs (1991–1992), cardiac arrest.
Todd Stadtman, 59, American musician and writer.
Mulyadi Tamsir, 39, Indonesian politician and student activist, chairman of the Muslim Students' Association (2015–2018), plane crash.
Berta Taracena, 95–96, Mexican historian and art critic.
Caroly Wilcox, 89, American puppeteer (The Muppet Show, Sesame Street, Fraggle Rock).
Jeannette Wood, 88, American politician, member of the Washington House of Representatives (1988–1994) and Senate (1994–1999).

10
Ahmet Vefik Alp, 72, Turkish architect and political advisor, heart attack.
Graham Arthur, 84, Australian football player (Hawthorn, Victoria) and coach.
Hubert Auriol, 68, French rally driver, Dakar Rally winner (1981, 1983, 1992), complications from COVID-19.
Sir David Barclay, 86, British businessman.
Joël Batteux, 77, French politician, mayor of Saint-Nazaire (1983–2014), complications from surgery.
Louis-Pierre Bougie, 74, Canadian painter and engraver, pneumonia.
Arthur Bramley, 91, English footballer (Mansfield Town).
Harry Brown, 72, American basketball player (Oklahoma Sooners), diabetes.
Michel Caffier, 90, French journalist and literary critic.
Pedro Casado, 83, Spanish footballer (Real Madrid, Sabadell, national team).
Tosh Chamberlain, 86, English footballer (Fulham, Dover Athletic, Gravesend and Northfleet).
Avelino Chaves, 89, Spanish football player (Real Zaragoza) and executive.
Adam Dyczkowski, 88, Polish Roman Catholic prelate and philosopher, bishop of Zielona Góra-Gorzów (1993–2007), COVID-19.
Nancy Walker Bush Ellis, 94, American philanthropist, complications from COVID-19.
Theo English, 90, Irish hurler (Marlfield, Tipperary).
Kristen K. Flaa, 95, Norwegian politician, mayor of Aust-Agder (1972–1976).
James Follett, 81, British writer (A Cage of Eagles).
Tom Gannon, 77, American politician, member of the Pennsylvania House of Representatives (1979–2006).
Bruno Ghedina, 77, Italian Olympic ice hockey player (1964), COVID-19.
Pedro González, 83, Dominican baseball player (New York Yankees, Cleveland Indians).
Tony Gregory, 83, English footballer (Luton Town, Watford).
Ángel Sergio Guerrero Mier, 85, Mexican politician, governor of Durango (1998–2004).
Robert Halley, 85, French politician and businessman.
Betty Lou Holland, 95, American actress.
Bobby Kellard, 77, English football player (Southend United, Portsmouth, Crystal Palace) and manager.
Aminu Isa Kontagora, 64, Nigerian politician, administrator of Benue State (1996–1998) and Kano State (1998–1999), COVID-19.
Sonny Leonard, 77, American engine designer and builder.
Christopher Maboulou, 30, French-Congolese footballer (Châteauroux, Bastia, PAS Giannina), heart attack.
Geraldo Antônio Miotto, 65, Brazilian general, commander of the Amazon Military Command (2016–2018) and Southern Military Command (2018–2020), COVID-19.
Behzad Moezi, 82, Iranian aviator, leukemia.
Tahir Mughal, 43, Pakistani cricketer (Gujranwala, Allied Bank Limited, National Bank of Pakistan), gallbladder cancer.
Josep Antoni Noya, 81, Spanish footballer (Sabadell, Atlético Madrid).
Barry Oringer, 85, American producer and screenwriter (Ben Casey, The Fugitive, Hotel).
Georges Pernoud, 73, French journalist, television presenter and television producer.
Wayne Radford, 64, American basketball player (Indiana Hoosiers, Indiana Pacers).
Benita Raphan, 58, American filmmaker and designer.
Dee Rowe, 91, American basketball coach (UConn Huskies), COVID-19 and cancer.
Antonio Sabàto Sr., 77, Italian-American actor (Grand Prix, One Dollar Too Many, Shoot Twice), COVID-19.
Donald Smith, 97, English cricketer (Sussex, national team).
Julie Strain, 58, American actress (Heavy Metal 2000) and model (Penthouse, Heavy Metal), complications from dementia.
David Stypka, 41, Czech singer-songwriter and guitarist, complications from pancreatic cancer and COVID-19.
Walter Taibo, 89, Uruguayan footballer (Huracán, Nacional, national team).
Mohammad Khaledur Rahman Tito, 75, Bangladeshi politician, MP (1986–1988, 2008–2014).
Pala Thankam, 79, Indian actress (Rebecca, Gangasangamam, Ormakal Marikkumo).
Thorleif Torstensson, 71, Swedish singer (Thorleifs), COVID-19.
Naseer Turabi, 75, Indian-born Pakistani poet.
Yeng Pway Ngon, 73, Singaporean writer and poet, prostate cancer.

11
Massoud Achkar, 64, Lebanese military leader and politician, COVID-19.
Sheldon Adelson, 87, American casino owner, founder of Las Vegas Sands, lymphoma.
Vassilis Alexakis, 77, Greek-born French writer and translator.
Guy Auffray, 75, French judoka.
Éric Babin, 61, New Caledonian politician, member of the Congress (1995–1999), traffic collision.
Edward Beard, 80, American politician, member of the Rhode Island House of Representatives (1972–1974) and U.S. House of Representatives (1975–1981), Parkinson's disease.
Joseph Berke, 81, American-born English psychotherapist and author, heart failure.
Roger Cayrel, 95, French astronomer.
José Centenera, 89, Spanish Olympic equestrian (1960).
Shashikumar Chitre, 84, Indian mathematician and astrophysicist.
Lloyd Cowan, 58, British hurdler and track coach.
Étienne Draber, 81, French actor (May Fools, Madame Bovary, House of D), COVID-19.
Fabio Enzo, 74, Italian footballer (Roma, Cesena, Novara), complications from COVID-19.
Yousef Ghawanmeh, 85, Jordanian historian.
Lionel Gossman, 91, Scottish-American literary scholar.
Ron Grigg, 92, British chemist.
Ian Griggs, 92, British Anglican prelate, bishop of Ludlow (1987–1994).
Ronald J. Hays, 92, American admiral.
Kathleen Heddle, 55, Canadian rower, Olympic champion (1992, 1996), breast and lymph node cancer.
Howard Johnson, 79, American jazz musician.
Mark Keds, 50, English singer (Senseless Things, Deadcuts), chronic obstructive pulmonary disease.
David Khakhaleishvili, 49, Georgian judoka, Olympic champion (1992), heart disease.
Gothard Kokott, 77, Polish football manager (Raków Częstochowa, Ruch Radzionków).
Paul Kölliker, 88, Swiss Olympic rower (1960), COVID-19.
Rada Lysenko, 99, Ukrainian pianist and pedagogue, People's Artist of Ukraine.
Bogdan Macovei, 67, Romanian handball manager (women's national team, Macedonia women's national team).
Mmule Maluleka, South African politician, member of the National Assembly (2009–2016), COVID-19.
Jean-Marie Marconot, 82, French sociolinguist.
Mario Masuku, 69, Swazi politician.
Tetsuo Najita, 84, American historian.
Lindiwe Ndlovu, 44, South African actress (Little One, EHostela).
Kurt Oddekalv, 63, Norwegian environmentalist, founder of Green Warriors of Norway, drowning.
Francis Perekamoya, 63, Malawian economist, governor of the Reserve Bank of Malawi (1992–1995), COVID-19.
Tord Peterson, 94, Swedish actor (Honeymoon, House of Angels, Echoes from the Dead).
Luis Adriano Piedrahíta Sandoval, 74, Colombian Roman Catholic prelate, bishop of Apartadó (2007–2014) and Santa Marta (since 2014), COVID-19.
Turlapaty Kutumba Rao, 87, Indian writer and orator.
Mizanur Rahman Khan, 53, Bangladeshi journalist, COVID-19.
Oscar Rizzato, 92, Italian Roman Catholic titular bishop, COVID-19.
Prentice Earl Sanders, 83, American police officer, chief of the San Francisco Police Department (2002–2003).
Benoît Sinzogan, 90, Beninese military officer and politician, minister of foreign affairs (1967–1968) and member of the Military Directorate (1969–1970).
Margo St. James, 83, American women's rights activist and sex worker.
Paul Taylor, 81, American engineer.
Howard Teten, 88, American FBI instructor, complications from COVID-19.
William E. Thornton, 91, American astronaut (Challenger).
Stacy Title, 56, American film director (The Bye Bye Man, The Last Supper, Hood of Horror), complications from amyotrophic lateral sclerosis.
Ganesh Shankar Vidyarthi, 96, Indian independence activist and politician, Bihar MLA (1977–1985) and MLC (1990–1996), COVID-19.

12
Frank Arok, 88, Serbian-Australian football player (FK Jedinstvo) and manager (St George Saints, Australia national team).
Lingson Belekanyama, Malawian politician, minister of local government and rural development (since 2020), COVID-19.
Bruce Bennett, 77, American Canadian football player (Saskatchewan Roughriders), pneumonia and COVID-19.
Florentin Crihălmeanu, 61, Romanian Greek Catholic hierarch, bishop of Cluj-Gherla (since 2002), COVID-19.
Wim de Graaff, 89, Dutch Olympic speed skater (1956, 1960) and coach.
Cecil Humphery-Smith, 92, British genealogist and heraldist.
Carlos Joseph, 40, American football player (San Diego Chargers, Manchester Wolves), ruptured brain aneurysm.
Sid Lerner, 90, American advertising executive, founder of Meatless Monday.
Tim Lester, 52, American football player (Los Angeles Rams, Pittsburgh Steelers, Dallas Cowboys), COVID-19.
Fred Levin, 83, American lawyer, COVID-19.
Barry Lewis, 75, American architectural historian, heart failure.
Mona Malm, 85, Swedish actress (Heja Roland!, Fanny and Alexander, The Tattooed Widow).
Per Martinsen, 84, Norwegian footballer (Lisleby, Fredrikstad, national team).
Álvaro Mejía, 80, Colombian Olympic long-distance runner (1964, 1968, 1972).
Sidik Mia, 55, Malawian politician, MP (2004–2014), minister of defence (2009–2010) and transport and public works (since 2020), COVID-19.
Willie Miller, 70, Scottish urban planner.
Theodoros Mitras, 72, Greek politician, MP (1993–1996).
Christopher P. Monkhouse, 73, American architectural historian, stroke.
Osvaldo Peredo, 79, Bolivian revolutionary (Ñancahuazú Guerrilla).
Philaret, 85, Belarusian Orthodox prelate, metropolitan of Minsk and Slutsk (1978–2013), leader of the Belarusian Orthodox Church (1990–2013), COVID-19.
John G. Ramsay, 89, British structural geologist.
Bridget Rowe, 70, British journalist, editor of Sunday Mirror (1991–1992, 1997–1998), The People (1992–1996), COVID-19.
Khalid bin Abdullah Al Saud, 84, Saudi royal, conglomerate magnate (Mawarid Holding) and horse stable owner (Juddmonte).
Liudmyla Semykina, 97, Ukrainian painter.
Shingoose, 74, Canadian folk musician, COVID-19.
João Henrique de Souza, 78, Brazilian politician, Paraíba MLA (since 2007), COVID-19.
Yuval Stonis, 37, Israeli actor and screenwriter, stomach cancer.
Keith Valigura, 63, American politician, member of the Texas House of Representatives (1985–1991).
John Ward, 83, New Zealand cricketer (Canterbury, national team).
Robert Warke, 90, Irish Anglican prelate, bishop of Cork, Cloyne and Ross (1988–1998).
Dame Margaret Weston, 94, British museum curator, director of the Science Museum (1973–1986).

13
Howard Andrew, 86, American poker player.
Tim Bogert, 76, American rock bassist (Vanilla Fudge, Beck, Bogert & Appice, Cactus), cancer.
Duke Bootee, 69, American rapper and songwriter ("The Message"), heart failure.
Nicky Booth, 40, British boxer.
Mario Cecchini, 87, Italian Roman Catholic prelate, bishop of Fano-Fossombrone-Cagli-Pergola (1986–1998), COVID-19.
Borivoje Cenić, 90, Serbian basketball player (Radnički Belgrade) and coach (OKK Beograd, Apollon Patras).
Patrick Chapuis, 71, French photographer.
Sir Robert Cohan, 95, American-born British dancer and choreographer, founder of The Place, London Contemporary Dance School, and LCDT.
Frank J. Coppa, 83, American historian and author.
Gerry Cottle, 75, British circus owner and presenter, COVID-19.
Siegfried Fischbacher, 81, German-American magician and entertainer (Siegfried & Roy), pancreatic cancer.
Benjamin F. Gibson, 89, American jurist, judge (1979–1999) and chief judge (1991–1995) of the U.S. District Court for Western Michigan.
Gimax, 83, Italian racing driver.
Henri Goraïeb, 85, Lebanese pianist.
Michel Gravel, 84, Canadian photographer.
Moses Hamungole, 53, Zambian Roman Catholic prelate, bishop of Monze (since 2014), COVID-19.
Ben Hines, 85, American baseball coach (Los Angeles Dodgers).
Ken Jones, 70, American LGBT rights activist, bladder cancer.
Bernd Kannenberg, 78, German race walker, Olympic champion (1972).
Ndubuisi Kanu, 77, Nigerian rear admiral and politician, military governor of Imo State (1976–1977) and Lagos State (1977–1978).
Gail Kopplin, 81, American politician, member of the Nebraska Legislature (2005–2009).
Fiu Loimata II, 79, Samoan politician, MP (1996–2001).
Norman MacLeod, 93, Canadian financier and politician, president of the Liberal Party (1980–1982).
Don Mason, 86, British immunologist.
Seyoum Mesfin, 71, Ethiopian politician and diplomat, minister of foreign affairs (1991–2010) and ambassador to China (2011–2017), shot.
Bryan Monroe, 55, American journalist (CNN, Ebony, Jet), heart attack.
Nelson Nieves, 86, Venezuelan Olympic fencer (1952).
Sinikka Nopola, 67, Finnish writer (Ricky Rapper).
Norodom Yuvaneath, 77, Cambodian prince, privy counsellor (1993–2004) and supreme royal advisor (since 2004).
Ben Nsibandze, 89, Swazi politician, acting prime minister (1979).
Mircea Păcurariu, 88, Romanian theologian.
Bruce Pasternack, 73, American businessman and philanthropist, president of the Special Olympics (2005–2007).
Devarapalli Prakash Rao, 62, Indian social worker, COVID-19.
Joël Robert, 77, Belgian motocross racer, six-time world champion, COVID-19.
Øyvind Sandberg, 67, Norwegian film director.
Marielle de Sarnez, 69, French politician, MEP (1999–2017), minister in charge of European affairs (2017), and deputy (since 2017), leukemia.
Eusébio Scheid, 88, Brazilian Roman Catholic cardinal, archbishop of São Sebastião do Rio de Janeiro (2001–2009), COVID-19.
Safwat El-Sherif, 87, Egyptian politician, minister of information (1981–2004) and speaker of the Shura Council (2004–2011), leukemia.
Sylvain Sylvain, 69, Egyptian-born American guitarist (New York Dolls), cancer.
Philip Tartaglia, 70, Scottish Roman Catholic prelate, metropolitan archbishop of Glasgow (since 2012), COVID-19.
Abay Tsehaye, 67, Ethiopian politician, co-founder of the Marxist–Leninist League of Tigray, shot.
Maguito Vilela, 71, Brazilian lawyer and politician, governor of Goiás (1995–1998), senator (1999–2007) and mayor-elect of Goiânia (since 2021), COVID-19.
Hannes Viljoen, 77, South African rugby union player (Natal, national team).
Timothy Whidborne, 93, British artist.

14
James B. Anderson, 85, American chemist and physicist.
Melanio Asensio, 84, Spanish Olympic sprinter (1960).
Veronica Beechey, 75, British feminist sociologist and patients' rights advocate.
Carlos Armando Biebrich, 81, Mexican lawyer and politician, deputy (1967–1970) and governor of Sonora (1973–1975), COVID-19.
Cliff Burvill, 83, Australian Olympic cyclist (1956), fall.
José Luis Caballero, 65, Mexican Olympic footballer (1976).
Storm Constantine, 64, British fantasy and science fiction author (Sea Dragon Heir, Grigori Trilogy).
Simon Crosse, 90, British Olympic rower (1960).
Todd Gabbett, 78, American football player (Illinois, Virginia Sailors) and coach.
Boris Grachevsky, 71, Russian film director, screenwriter and actor (Yeralash), COVID-19.
Vicente Alejandro Guillamón, 90, Spanish journalist.
Eiji Hashimoto, 89, Japanese-American harpsichordist.
Sheikh Ali Jaber, 44, Saudi-born Indonesian Islamic cleric.
Shirley Johnson, 83, American politician, member of the Michigan House of Representatives (1981–1992, 1993–1998) and Senate (1999–2004).
John LaRose, 69, American baseball player (Boston Red Sox), COVID-19.
Vincent Logan, 79, Scottish Roman Catholic prelate, bishop of Dunkeld (1981–2012), COVID-19.
Harold Lawrence McPheeters, 97, American psychiatrist.
Brian Moller, 85, Irish Anglican priest, dean of Connor (1998–2001).
Elijah Moshinsky, 75, Australian opera, theatre, and television director, COVID-19.
Evžen Neustupný, 87, Czech archaeologist.
Aleksandr Nikitin, 59, Russian football player (Torpedo Volzhsky, SKA Rostov-on-Don, Rotor Volgograd) and manager.
Leonidas Pelekanakis, 58, Greek Olympic sailor (1984, 2000, 2004), COVID-19.
Yrjö Rantanen, 70, Finnish chess grandmaster.
Peter Mark Richman, 93, American actor (Dynasty, Friday the 13th Part VIII: Jason Takes Manhattan, Poolhall Junkies).
David Roth, 68, American magician.
Éamonn Ryan, 79, Irish Gaelic football player (Glenville, UCC) and manager (Cork).
Ron Samford, 90, American baseball player (New York Giants, Detroit Tigers, Washington Senators).
Jane Sinclair, 64, British Anglican priest, canon of Westminster (2014–2020).
Jember Teferra, 77, Malagasy-born Ethiopian community development worker.
Jan de Vries, 77, Dutch motorcycle racer, cardiac arrest.
Larry Willoughby, 70, American country singer-songwriter ("Building Bridges", "Operator, Operator") and music executive, vice-president of A&R at Capitol Records, COVID-19.
Dinesh Chandra Yadav, Nepalese politician, member of the Constituent Assembly (2014–2017), COVID-19.
Roman Zakharov, 91, Russian Olympic rower (1952).

15
William R. Allen, 96, American economist.
Dale Baer, 70, American animator (The Lion King, Who Framed Roger Rabbit, Robin Hood), complications from amyotrophic lateral sclerosis.
Sjarifuddin Baharsjah, 89, Indonesian academic and politician, minister of agriculture (1993–1998).
Geoff Barnett, 74, English footballer (Everton, Arsenal, Minnesota Kicks), complications from COVID-19.
Wilbur Brotherton, 98, American politician, member of the Michigan House of Representatives (1975–1988).
Michael Bryce, 82, Australian architect and graphic designer, spouse of the governor-general (2008–2014).
Vicente Cantatore, 85, Argentine football player (San Lorenzo, Tigre) and manager (Real Valladolid).
Rosalind Cartwright, 98, American neuroscientist.
Tyrone Crawley, 62, American boxer.
Dalakhani, 21, Irish racehorse and sire.
Elizam Escobar, 72, Puerto Rican art theorist, poet, and political activist, cancer.
Gildardo García, 66, Colombian chess grandmaster, COVID-19.
B. S. Gnanadesikan, 71, Indian politician, MP (2001–2013).
James Gustafson, 95, American theological ethicist.
Alan Hart, 85, British television executive, controller of BBC1 (1981–1984).
Bruce Headley, 86, American thoroughbred trainer (Kona Gold, Got Koko), stroke.
Michael Kelly, 91, Irish Jesuit priest and missionary.
Kathleen Krull, 68, American children's writer and book editor, cancer.
Eddie Kuligowski, 74, French photographer.
Ramji Lal, 88, Indian politician, MP (1992–1993, 1994–2000).
Mark Langham, 60, British Roman Catholic priest.
Lệ Thu, 77, Vietnamese-American singer, COVID-19.
Tiit Lilleorg, 79, Estonian actor (Agent Wild Duck, Autumn Ball, O2), COVID-19.
Thomas V. Miller Jr., 78, American politician, member of the Maryland House of Delegates (1971–1975) and Senate (1975–2020), president of the Senate (1987–2020), prostate cancer.
Kamal Morarka, 74, Indian businessman and politician, MP (1988–1994).
Benjamin de Rothschild, 57, French banker, heart attack.
J. Michael Schweder, 71, American politician, member of the Pennsylvania House of Representatives (1975–1980).
Olav M. Skulberg, 90, Norwegian limnologist.
Jeffrey L. Smith, 35, American police officer (D.C. Metropolitan Police), suicide.
Paola Veneroni, 99, Italian actress (Maddalena, Zero for Conduct).
Anatoliy Vishnevskiy, 85, Russian economist and demographer.
Mihajlo Vuković, 76, Serbian basketball player (Sloboda Tuzla) and coach (Valencia Basket, Yugoslavia women's national team).
Jon Westling, 78, American educator, president of Boston University (1996–2002).
Gerald Wiegert, 76, American automotive businessman and engineer, founder of Vector Motors.
James White, 78, American politician, member of the New Mexico House of Representatives (2009–2015), and Senate (since 2016).
Bill Whitehead, 89, New Zealand sports administrator.

16
Salleh Abas, 91, Malaysian judge and politician, Lord President of the Supreme Court (1984–1988) and Terengganu MLA (1999–2004), COVID-19.
Ernest Ako, 97, Ghanaian police officer, inspector general of police (1974–1978).
Jon Arnett, 85, American Hall of Fame football player (USC Trojans, Los Angeles Rams), heart failure.
Sharon Begley, 64, American science journalist.
Mahaveer Bhagora, 73, Indian politician, MP (2004–2009), COVID-19.
Jerry Brandt, 82, American club owner and manager (The Ritz), COVID-19 and pneumonia.
Charlotte Cornwell, 71, English actress (Dressing for Breakfast, The Saint, White Hunter Black Heart), cancer.
Choi Jeongrye, 65, South Korean poet.
Juan Carlos Copes, 89, Argentine tango dancer and choreographer, COVID-19.
Chris Cramer, 73, British news journalist and executive (BBC News, CNN International), cancer.
Little Walter DeVenne, 73, American radio host, COVID-19.
Einar Eriksen, 87, Norwegian newspaper editor, chief editor of Bergens Tidende (1986–1991).
Alice Gibson, 97, Belizean librarian.
György Handel, 61, Hungarian footballer (MTK-VM, Rába ETO, national team), COVID-19.
Dustin Higgs, 48, American convicted murderer, execution by lethal injection.
Xavier Hunault, 97, French politician, deputy (1962–1993).
Bob Langas, 90, American football player (Baltimore Colts).
Mona Lohanda, 73, Indonesian historian, archivist and academic, heart attack.
Jim MacGeorge, 92, American voice actor (Bionic Six, Captain Caveman and the Teen Angels, Clue Club).
Pave Maijanen, 70, Finnish musician (Hurriganes, Dingo), complications from amyotrophic lateral sclerosis.
George von Mallinckrodt, 90, German merchant banker, chairman of Schroders (1984–1995).
Sergi Mingote, 49, Spanish mountain climber and politician, mayor of Parets del Vallès (2011–2018), mountaineering fall.
Steve Molnar, 73, Canadian football player (Saskatchewan Roughriders).
Claudia Montero, 58, Argentine classical composer, Latin Grammy winner (2014, 2016, 2018), cancer.
Chris Murphy, 66, Australian talent manager (INXS, Models), lymphoma.
Carlo Nayaradou, 63, French-Martinican comic book author.
Petrica Novosel Žic, 89, Croatian cartographer and academic.
Christian Myekeni Ntshangase, Swazi politician, minister of public service (since 2019), COVID-19.
Bheki Ntuli, 63, South African politician, MP (1999–2003), COVID-19.
Meghrig Parikian, 53, Armenian Apostolic prelate, bishop of Canada (since 2014).
Farida Pasha, 68, Indonesian actress (Misteri Gunung Merapi), COVID-19.
Phương Mai, 83, Vietnamese princess.
Jimmy Powell, 85, American golfer, kidney failure.
Sergei Rodin, 39, Russian footballer (CSKA Moscow, Sportakademklub Moscow, Sokol Saratov).
Om Prakash Sharma, 87, Indian politician, Uttar Pradesh MLC (1972–2020), dysentery.
David Shaw-Smith, 81, Irish film director (Hands).
Phil Spector, 81, American Hall of Fame record producer (Wall of Sound), musician (The Teddy Bears), and convicted murderer, founder of Philles Records, COVID-19.
Muammer Sun, 88, Turkish composer, multiple organ dysfunction syndrome.
Sayidiman Suryohadiprojo, 93, Indonesian military officer and diplomat, deputy chief of staff of the Army (1973–1974).
Arturo Tizón, 36, Spanish motorcycle racer, mountain bike fall.
Pedro Trebbau, 91, German-born Venezuelan zoologist.
Paul Varelans, 51, American mixed martial artist (UFC), COVID-19.
Lars Westman, 86, Swedish writer.

17
Nikolay Antoshkin, 78, Russian military officer (Chernobyl disaster), Hero of the Soviet Union, deputy (since 2014), COVID-19.
Dave Arnold, 49, American politician, member of the Pennsylvania State Senate (since 2020), brain cancer.
Keith Arnold, 94, British Anglican prelate, bishop of Warwick (1980–1990).
Jacques Bral, 72, French film director (Black Really Suits You) and screenwriter.
Manford Byrd Jr., 92, American academic administrator, superintendent of Chicago Public Schools (1985–1989).
Luis María Cassoni, 82, Argentine politician and pharmacist, governor of Misiones Province (1987), COVID-19.
Joevana Charles, 66, Seychellois politician, member of the National Assembly (1993–2016).
Robert Cheezic, 82, American Tang Soo Do practitioner.
Brian Christie, American news host and journalist (CNN, WRAU-TV Peoria, WCVB-TV Boston).
Camille Cléroux, 67, Canadian serial killer.
Giles Constable, 91, British historian.
Víctor Crisólogo, 68, Peruvian politician, congressman (2011–2016), COVID-19.
Abel Gabuza, 65, South African Roman Catholic prelate, archbishop coadjutor of Durban (since 2018) and bishop of Kimberley (2010–2018), COVID-19.
Barbara Gronemus, 89, American politician, member of the Wisconsin State Assembly (1982–2008).
Muriel Grossfeld, 80, American Olympic gymnast (1956, 1960, 1964).
Ghulam Mustafa Khan, 89, Indian classical singer.
Kurofune, 22, American-bred Japanese Thoroughbred racehorse.
Marlin Kuykendall, 86, American politician, mayor of Prescott, Arizona (2009–2015).
David Lea, 85, Australian politician, Victoria MLA (1985–1992).
Gerald Locklin, 79, American poet and lecturer, COVID-19.
Roger Machin, 94, French football referee.
Junior Mance, 92, American jazz pianist and educator.
Jubril Martins-Kuye, 78, Nigerian politician, minister of commerce and industry (2010–2011).
Haydn Morris, 92, Welsh rugby union player (Cardiff, British & Irish Lions, national team), fall.
Sammy Nestico, 96, American jazz composer and arranger.
Tom Prebble, 75, British-born New Zealand educationalist and university administrator (Massey University).
Vincent M. Rizzotto, 89, American Roman Catholic prelate, auxiliary bishop of Galveston–Houston (2001–2006).
József Sas, 82, Hungarian stage actor, comedian and theatre director, COVID-19.
K. G. Shankar, 70, Indian politician, Puducherry MLA (since 2017), cardiac arrest.
Jon Sullivan, 70, Australian politician, Queensland MLA (1989–1998) and MP (2007–2010).
Marius Swart, 79, South African politician, executive mayor of the George Local Municipality (2000–2004) and MP (2004–2014), COVID-19.
Vicent Tur, 62, Spanish politician, member of the Parliament of the Balearic Islands (1984-1987, 1991–2007), cancer.
Joan Eloi Vila, 61, Spanish guitarist.
Maynard Wallace, 77, American politician, member of the Missouri House of Representatives (2003–2011).
Philip Wilson, 70, Australian Roman Catholic prelate, archbishop of Adelaide (2001–2018).
Liane Winter, 78, German long-distance runner.

18
Harry Abend, 83, Polish-born Venezuelan sculptor and architect.
Jean-Pierre Bacri, 69, Algerian-born French actor (Same Old Song, Place Vendôme) and screenwriter (The Taste of Others), cancer.
Perry Botkin Jr., 87, American composer and musician (Happy Days, Mork & Mindy, "Nadia's Theme"), Grammy winner (1978).
Carlos Burga, 68, Peruvian Olympic boxer (1972), COVID-19.
Alberto Cantù, 70, Italian musicologist and musical critic.
Volodymyr Chernyak, 79, Ukrainian politician, MP (1998–2006), COVID-19.
Jean Dumont, 90, French politician, senator (1986–1995).
Ash Gardiner, 74, New Zealand rugby union player (Taranaki, national team).
Svavar Gestsson, 76, Icelandic politician and diplomat, minister of social affairs (1980–1983), ambassador to Sweden (2001–2005) and Denmark (2005–2012).
Andy Gray, 61, Scottish actor (River City, Naked Video), COVID-19.
James D. Heiple, 87, American jurist, justice (1990–2000) and chief justice (1997) of the Supreme Court of Illinois, brain hemorrhage.
Nombulelo Hermans, 51, South African politician, member of the National Assembly (since 2019), COVID-19.
Joyce Hill, 95, American baseball player (South Bend Blue Sox, Peoria Redwings, Racine Belles).
Alan J. Hoffman, 96, American mathematician (Hoffman–Singleton graph).
Sinclair Hood, 103, British archaeologist, director of the British School at Athens (1980–1997).
Tony Ingle, 68, American basketball coach (BYU Cougars, Kennesaw State Owls, Dalton State Roadrunners), COVID-19.
Thorsten Johansson, 70, Swedish Olympic sprinter (1976).
Lubomir Kavalek, 77, Czech-American Hall of Fame chess grandmaster.
Maria Koterbska, 96, Polish singer.
Ákos Kriza, 55, Hungarian health economist and politician, mayor of Miskolc (2010–2019).
Joshua Kyeremeh, Ghanaian politician, kidney complications.
Jack London, 83, American information technology executive, chairman of the board of CACI International Inc.
Stephen Lungu, 78, Zimbabwean evangelist, COVID-19.
Josep Mestres Quadreny, 91, Spanish composer.
Chuck Mills, 92, American football coach (Utah State, Southern Oregon), pneumonia and organ failure.
Vic Mitchell, 86, British railway preservationist and writer.
Dündar Ali Osman, 90, Turkish royal, head of the House of Osman (since 2017).
Henryk Ostrowski, 60, Polish politician and farmer, deputy (2001–2005).
V. Doraswamy Raju, 74, Indian film producer (Seetharamayya Gari Manavaralu, Annamayya) and politician, Andhra Pradesh MLA (1994–1999), cardiac arrest.
Catherine Rich, 88, French actress.
David Richardson, 65, American television writer and producer (The Simpsons, Two and a Half Men, F Is for Family), heart failure.
Francisco Daniel Rivera Sánchez, 65, Mexican Roman Catholic prelate, auxiliary bishop of Mexico (since 2020), COVID-19.
Jimmie Rodgers, 87, American pop singer ("Honeycomb", "Kisses Sweeter than Wine", "Secretly").
John Russell, 66, English guitarist.
Dani Shmulevich-Rom, 80, Israeli footballer (Maccabi Haifa, national team), cancer.
Gatot Sudjito, 60, Indonesian politician, MP (since 2014), COVID-19.
Juan Carlos Tabío, 77, Cuban film director (Strawberry and Chocolate, Lista de Espera, 7 Days in Havana).
Kees Teer, 95, Dutch electrical engineer, director of Philips Natuurkundig Laboratorium (1968–1985).
K. V. Vijayadas, 61, Indian politician, Kerala MLA (since 2011), cerebral haemorrhage.

19
Habibullah Abdurazzaq, 83, Tajik actor (Ilya Muromets).
José Alves, 86, Brazilian footballer (Botafogo, Corinthians, América).
Ron Anthony, 87, American jazz guitarist and singer.
John G. Bartlett, 83, American physician and medical researcher, pneumonia.
Morice Benin, 73, French singer.
Ginette Bucaille, 94, French tennis player, 1954 French Championships finalist.
Mujibur Rahman Dilu, 69, Bangladeshi actor (Songsoptok), pneumonia.
William Fey, 78, American Roman Catholic prelate, bishop of Kimbe (2010–2019), COVID-19.
Gordon Galley, 90, English footballer (Darlington, Sheffield Wednesday) and police officer.
Louis Giani, 86, American Olympic wrestler (1960).
Lou Goetz, 74, American basketball coach (Richmond Spiders), cancer.
Renita Grigoryeva, 89, Russian film director, screenwriter (Boys) and actress (There Is Such a Lad).
Brian Hillery, 83, Irish politician, senator (1977–1982, 1983–1989, 1992–1997) and TD (1989–1992).
Roberta Hodes, 93, American screenwriter (Lad, a Dog) and script supervisor (On the Waterfront, The King of Comedy).
W. John Hutchins, 81, English linguist.
Danial Jahić, 41, Serbian Olympic long jumper (2000), COVID-19.
Daniel Kobialka, 77, American violinist.
Lâm Quang Thi, 88, Vietnamese military officer (ARVN), COVID-19.
Narendra Luther, 88, Indian writer and civil servant.
Emanuele Macaluso, 96, Italian trade unionist, journalist and politician, deputy (1963–1976) and senator (1976–1992), editor-in-chief of L'Unità (1982–1986), complications from a fall.
Cesare Maestri, 91, Italian mountaineer and writer.
Enrique Marcatili, 95, Argentine-American physicist.
James Kombo Moyana, 78, Zimbabwean banker, governor of the Reserve Bank of Zimbabwe (1983–1993), COVID-19.
Mieko Nagaoka, 106, Japanese swimmer, respiratory failure.
James L. Nagle, 83, American architect (Chicago Seven), complications from Alzheimer's disease.
Diana O'Hehir, 98, American poet and author.
Gustavo Peña, 78, Mexican football player (Monterrey, national team) and manager (Leones Negros), COVID-19.
Toleafoa Ken Vaafusuaga Poutoa, 53, Samoan politician, MP (since 2016).
Felipe Quispe, 78, Bolivian Quechua politician, Indigenous rights activist and peasant leader (CSUTCB), deputy (2002–2004), cardiac arrest.
V. Shanta, 93, Indian oncologist, director of the Adyar Cancer Institute (1980–1997), heart attack.
Zdeněk Sternberg, 97, Czech aristocrat, Medal of Merit recipient.
Don Sutton, 75, American Hall of Fame baseball player (Los Angeles Dodgers, California Angels, Milwaukee Brewers) and broadcaster, cancer.
Carlos Tapia García, 79, Peruvian politician, congressman (1985–1990) and member of the Truth and Reconciliation Commission (2001–2003), COVID-19.
Jack Turley, 93, American screenwriter (General Hospital, Hawaii Five-O, The Man from U.N.C.L.E.).
Jim Vickerman, 89, American politician, member of the Minnesota Senate (1987–2011).
Ellinah Wamukoya, 69, Swazi Anglican prelate, bishop of Eswatini (since 2012), COVID-19.
Bob Williams, 89, American basketball player (Minneapolis Lakers, Harlem Globetrotters).
Mark Wilson, 91, American magician and author.
Giovanni Zucchi, 89, Italian rower, Olympic bronze medalist (1960).

20
Raisuddin Ahmed, 82, Bangladeshi cricket player (Dhaka University) and administrator, COVID-19.
Jaume Bassó, 91, Spanish basketball player (Club Joventut Badalona, national team).
Dinesh Chandra Bhandary, 86, Indian military officer.
Doug Bowden, 93, New Zealand cricketer (Central Districts).
Claude Bremond, 91–92, French semiologist.
David Brewster, 56, British politician, member of the Northern Ireland Forum (1996–1998), heart attack.
Sir Keith Bright, 89, British transport executive, chairman of London Regional Transport.
Aslan Byutukayev, 46, Russian Islamic militant, commander of Riyad-us Saliheen Brigade of Martyrs (since 2010), shot.
Marion Colthorpe, 87, British historian.
Mira Furlan, 65, Croatian-American actress (Babylon 5, Lost, The Abandoned), complications from West Nile virus.
Joyce Hearn, 91, American politician, member of South Carolina House of Representatives (1975–1990).
John Jeffers, 52, English footballer (Port Vale, Shrewsbury Town, Stockport County).
Pam Johnson, 74, American newspaper editor, dementia.
John Baptist Kaggwa, 77, Ugandan Roman Catholic prelate, bishop of Masaka (1998–2019), COVID-19.
Justin Lekhanya, 82, Lesothan politician, chairman of the Military Council (1986–1991).
Joyce Lishman, 73, British social worker, bronchopneumonia.
Gordon McVie, 76, British oncologist.
Rabi Mishra, 64, Indian actor (Dhauli Express), cardiac arrest.
Sibusiso Moyo, 60, Zimbabwean politician, minister of foreign affairs (since 2017), COVID-19.
Unnikrishnan Namboothiri, 97, Indian actor (Kalyanaraman, Mayamohini, Photographer), complications from COVID-19.
Ronnie Nasralla, 90, Jamaican record producer (Byron Lee and the Dragonaires).
Lonnie Nielsen, 67, American golfer.
Storrs L. Olson, 76, American paleontologist and ornithologist.
Wayne Roberts, 76, Canadian food analyst and writer.
Mike Sadek, 74, American baseball player (San Francisco Giants), heart and lung disease.
Abdul Sahrin, 70, Filipino revolutionary (Moro National Liberation Front) and politician, member of the Bangsamoro Transition Authority Parliament (since 2019), brain tumor.
Gajendra Singh Shaktawat, 47, Indian politician, Rajasthan MLA (2008–2013, since 2018), COVID-19.
Eden Shand, 81, Trinidadian environmentalist and politician, MP (1987–1991).
Bill Sheat, 90, New Zealand lawyer and arts advocate.
Dominic J. Squatrito, 82, American jurist, judge of the U.S. District Court for Connecticut (since 1994).
Peter Swan, 84, English footballer (Sheffield Wednesday, Matlock Town, national team).
Ted Thompson, 68, American football player (Houston Oilers) and executive, general manager of Green Bay Packers, Super Bowl champion (1997, 2011), dysautonomia.
Martha Jachi Umbulla, 65, Tanzanian politician, MNA (since 2005).
Harold Widom, 88, American mathematician, complications from COVID-19.
Ian Wilson, 81, English cinematographer (The Crying Game, Emma, Erik the Viking), COVID-19.
Harthorne Wingo, 73, American basketball player (Allentown Jets, New York Knicks, Pallacanestro Cantù).
Boris Zaborov, 85, Belarusian artist.

21
Clarence Allen, 95, American geologist and seismologist.
Calixto Avena, 77, Colombian footballer (Millonarios, Atlético Junior, national team), COVID-19.
Bob Avian, 83, American choreographer and theatre producer (Dreamgirls, A Chorus Line, West Side Story), cardiac arrest.
Evert Båge, 95, Swedish major general.
Fred C. Bailey, 95, American engineer.
Dave Bolton, 83, English rugby league player (Wigan, Balmain, Blackpool Borough).
Donna Britt, 62, American news anchor (WAFB), complications from amyotrophic lateral sclerosis.
Howard Carson, 63, American football player (Los Angeles Rams).
Henryk Chmielewski, 97, Polish comic book artist (Tytus, Romek i A'Tomek).
Hank Coe, 74, American politician, member of the Wyoming Senate (1989–2021), cancer.
Anthony Dawes, 92, British actor (The Avengers, Fawlty Towers, Z-Cars).
Nathalie Delon, 79, French actress (When Eight Bells Toll, The Monk, Le Samouraï), cancer.
Brian G. Gardiner, 88, British palaeontologist and zoologist.
Jorunn Bjørg Giske, 93, Norwegian politician, deputy MP (1973–1977).
Jean Graton, 97, French comic book writer and artist (Michel Vaillant).
Kenneth Halverson, 87, American politician, member of the Pennsylvania House of Representatives (1967–1968, 1969–1980).
George T. Heery, 93, American architect.
Mauricio Herdocia Sacasa, 63, Nicaraguan jurist, general secretary of Central American Integration System (2000).
Hasso Hofmann, 86, German philosopher.
Rémy Julienne, 90, French stuntman (Licence to Kill, Fantômas, The Da Vinci Code), COVID-19.
Jerry Kiernan, 67, Irish Olympic long-distance runner (1984).
Roger LeClerc, 84, American football player (Chicago Bears, Denver Broncos).
Abdul Majid Mandal, 72, Bangladeshi politician, MP (2014–2018).
Jackson Mthembu, 62, South African politician, MP (since 2014) and minister in the Presidency (since 2019), complications from COVID-19.
Cecilia Mangini, 93, Italian film director.
Anthony Mwamba, 60, Zambian Olympic boxer (1988), COVID-19.
Keith Nichols, 75, English jazz musician and arranger, COVID-19.
Solveig Nordström, 97, Swedish archeologist.
José Pampuro, 71, Argentine politician, general secretary of the Presidency (2002–2003), minister of defense (2003–2005), and provisional president of the Senate (2006–2011).
Randy Parton, 67, American country singer-songwriter, cancer.
José Rivera Pérez, 73, Spanish bullfighter, cancer.
Johnny Rogan, 67, English music journalist and biographer (Van Morrison: No Surrender).
Phillip Russell, 88, American arbovirologist and general, cancer.
Guy Shuttleworth, 94, English cricketer (Cambridge University).
José Crisologo Sorra, 91, Filipino Roman Catholic prelate, bishop of Virac (1974–1993) and Legazpi (1993–2005).
Dalma Špitzerová, 95, Slovak actress.
Tony Waldron, British bioarchaeologist. (death announced on this date)

22
Hank Aaron, 86, American Hall of Fame baseball player (Milwaukee/Atlanta Braves, Milwaukee Brewers, Indianapolis Clowns) and civil rights activist.
Edwin Ariyadasa, 98, Sri Lankan journalist.
Jean-Pierre Baeumler, 72, French politician, deputy (1988–1993, 1997–2002).
Jacqueline Berenstein-Wavre, 99, Swiss politician and feminist, member of the Grand Council of Geneva (1973–1989).
José Manuel Botella Crespo, 71, Spanish politician, deputy (1986–1993) and member of the Corts Valencianes (1991–2003).
Élisabeth Burdot, 81, Belgian journalist.
Ron Campbell, 81, Australian animator (Yellow Submarine, The Flintstones, The New Adventures of Winnie the Pooh).
Narendra Chanchal, 80, Indian singer.
Aeneas Chigwedere, 81, Zimbabwean politician, minister of education (2001–2008) and governor of Mashonaland East (2008–2013), COVID-19.
Hughroy Currie, 61, Jamaican-born British boxer.
Louis Dandrel, 82, French sound designer and musician.
Nick Drake-Lee, 78, English rugby union player (Leicester Tigers, national team).
Ricardo Durão, 92, Portuguese Olympic modern pentathlete (1952).
José Ángel García, 70, Mexican actor and television director (La rosa de Guadalupe), pulmonary fibrosis.
Routouang Yoma Golom, Chadian militant and politician, MP (since 2011).
Feliks Gromov, 83, Russian admiral, commander-in-chief of the Navy (1992–1997).
Guem, 73, Algerian musician, composer and dancer.
Juan Guzmán Tapia, 81, Chilean judge (Augusto Pinochet's arrest and trial).
Jean Assaad Haddad, 94, Lebanese Melkite Greek Catholic hierarch, archeparch of Tyre (1988–2005).
Marius van Heerden, 46, South African Olympic middle-distance runner (1996), COVID-19.
Ibrahim Ishaq, 75, Sudanese writer.
Tony Jones, 54, American football player (Denver Broncos, Cleveland Browns, Baltimore Ravens).
Jorunn Kirkenær, 94, Norwegian ballet dancer.
Steven T. Kuykendall, 73, American politician, member of the California State Assembly (1994–1998) and U.S. House of Representatives (1999–2001), pulmonary fibrosis.
Janet Lawson, 80, American jazz singer.
Gianfranco Lombardi, 79, Italian Hall of Fame basketball player (Virtus Bologna, national team) and coach (Scaligera Verona).
Alfredo Magarotto, 93, Italian Roman Catholic prelate, bishop of Chioggia (1990–1997) and Vittorio Veneto (1997–2003).
Meherzia Labidi Maïza, 57, Tunisian politician and translator, member of the Constituent Assembly (2011–2014) and deputy (since 2014).
Joel Matiza, 60, Zimbabwean politician, minister of transport, communication and infrastructural development (since 2018), COVID-19.
Forrest Moses, 86, American abstract painter.
Sharon Kay Penman, 75, American historical novelist, pneumonia.
Harry Perry, 86, Irish Olympic boxer (1956, 1960).
Cyril Pinder, 74, American football player (Philadelphia Eagles, Chicago Bears, Dallas Cowboys).
James Purify, 76, American soul singer (James & Bobby Purify), complications of COVID-19.
Freddie Ryder, 78, British singer and guitarist.
Abdul Aziz Said, 90, Syrian-American political scientist.
Martin Schneider, 82, German opera director.
Alan Selman, 79, American mathematician and theoretical computer scientist.
Luton Shelton, 35, Jamaican footballer (Harbour View, Vålerenga, national team), complications from amyotrophic lateral sclerosis.
Raimo Suikkanen, 78, Finnish Olympic racing cyclist (1968, 1972).
F. X. Sudjasmin, 77, Indonesian military officer, deputy chief of staff of the Army (1995–1997).
Johnny Williams, 73, English footballer (Watford, Colchester United, Margate).
Paradzai Zimondi, 73, Zimbabwean independence activist and military officer, COVID-19.

23
Carlos Antunes, 82, Portuguese revolutionary and anti-fascist militant, COVID-19.
RaNae Bair, 77, American Olympic javelin thrower (1964, 1968), cancer.
Walter Bernstein, 101, American screenwriter (The Front, Miss Evers' Boys) and film director (Little Miss Marker), pneumonia.
Emil Bildstein, 89, German Olympic water polo player (1952, 1956, 1960).
Sylvanus Blackman, 87, Barbadian-British Olympic weightlifter (1960, 1964, 1968).
Marty Brill, 88, American comedian and actor (The Pope of Greenwich Village).
Andrew Brooks, 51, American medical researcher, heart attack.
Mohamed Hédi Chérif, 88, Tunisian historian and academic.
Charles Dyer, 92, English screenwriter (Rattle of a Simple Man, Staircase), playwright and actor.
Dennis Ede, 89, British Anglican priest, archdeacon of Stoke (1989–1997).
Tony Ferrer, 86, Filipino actor (The Vengeance of Fu Manchu, Chinatown: Sa Kuko ng Dragon, Manila Boy), heart disease.
Paul Foytack, 90, American baseball player (Detroit Tigers, Los Angeles Angels).
Abukari Gariba, 81, Ghanaian Olympic footballer (1968, 1972).
Peter Gillott, 85, English footballer (Barnsley, Chelmsford City).
Alberto Grimaldi, 95, Italian film producer (The Good, the Bad and the Ugly, Gangs of New York, Last Tango in Paris).
Jonas Gwangwa, 83, South African jazz trombonist and film composer (Cry Freedom).
Sir Peter Harper, 81, British geneticist.
Hal Holbrook, 95, American actor (Mark Twain Tonight!, All the President's Men, Into the Wild), Emmy winner (1971, 1974, 1976, 1989).
Larry King, 87, American Hall of Fame broadcaster (Larry King Live, Larry King Now, Politicking with Larry King), sepsis as a complication of COVID-19.
Martha Madrigal, 92, Mexican poet, COVID-19.
Lothar Metz, 82, German Olympic wrestler, gold (1968), silver (1960), and bronze medalist (1964).
Geronimo Meynier, 79, Italian actor.
Trisha Noble, 76, Australian singer and actress (Star Wars: Episode III – Revenge of the Sith, Strike Force), mesothelioma.
John Oliver, 81, English Anglican priest, archdeacon of Leeds (1992–2005).
Nilda Pedrosa, 46, American politician, acting under secretary of state for public diplomacy and public affairs (2020–2021), cancer.
Omar Pirrera, 88, Italian poet, COVID-19.
J. D. Power III, 89, American marketing executive, founder of J.D. Power.
Margherita Roberti, 95, American operatic soprano.
Robert Rowland, 54, British politician, MEP (2019–2020), drowned.
Sumiko Sakamoto, 84, Japanese actress (The Pornographers, Warm Water Under a Red Bridge, The Ballad of Narayama) and singer, stroke.
Robert William Schrier, 84, American medical researcher.
Song Yoo-jung, 26, South Korean actress (Golden Rainbow, Make Your Wish, School 2017).
Tom Stevens, 64, American musician (The Long Ryders).
Wayne Stevens, 84, American basketball player (Cincinnati Royals).
Roy Torrens, 72, Irish cricket player and manager (national team), COVID-19.
Makhosi Vilakati, Swazi politician, minister of labour and social security (since 2019), COVID-19.
George Weatherill, 84, Australian politician, South Australia MLC (1986–2000).
Pheoris West, 70, American artist.
Gunawan Wirosaroyo, 74, Indonesian politician, MP (1999–2009).
Joan Luedders Wolfe, 91, American environmentalist.

24
George Armstrong, 90, Canadian Hall of Fame ice hockey player (Toronto Maple Leafs), Stanley Cup champion (1962–1964, 1967).
Arik Brauer, 92, Austrian artist, co-founder of the Vienna School of Fantastic Realism.
Jevrem Brković, 87, Montenegrin writer, poet, and historian.
Roberto Cañas López, 70, Salvadoran politician, economist and academic, signatory of the Chapultepec Peace Accords.
Nikolay Chebotko, 38, Kazakh Olympic cross country skier (2002, 2006, 2010, 2014), traffic collision.
António Cardoso e Cunha, 87, Portuguese politician, European Commissioner (1986–1992).
Muhanna Al-Dura, 83, Jordanian painter.
Jóhannes Eðvaldsson, 70, Icelandic footballer (Celtic, Motherwell, national team).
Sonny Fox, 95, American television host (Wonderama, Way Out Games), COVID-19.
John F. Grundhofer, 82, American banker and executive, chairman of U.S. Bancorp (1990–1997, 1999–2002).
Abdullahi Ibrahim, 82, Nigerian lawyer and politician, minister of justice (1997–1999), COVID-19.
Jerry Johnson, 102, American basketball coach (LeMoyne–Owen Magicians).
Bruce Kirby, 95, American actor (L.A. Law, Stand by Me, Crash).
Franciszek Kokot, 91, Polish nephrologist and endocrinologist, rector of Medical Academy of Silesia (1982–1984), complications from COVID-19.
Barry Le Va, 79, American sculptor and installation artist.
Gunnel Lindblom, 89, Swedish actress (The Silence, Winter Light, The Virgin Spring).
William Alwyn Lishman, 89, British psychiatrist and neurologist.
Sigvard Marjasin, 91, Swedish civil servant, president of the Swedish Municipal Workers' Union (1977–1988) and governor of Örebro County (1989–1994), COVID-19.
Bobby McKee, 79, Northern Irish politician, mayor of Larne (2002–2004, 2011–2012).
Jean-Pierre Michel, 82, French politician, deputy (1981–1986, 1988–2002) and senator (2004–2014).
Barrie Mitchell, 73, Scottish footballer (Dunfermline Athletic, Aberdeen, Tranmere Rovers).
Moshe Moskowitz, 96, Israeli politician, head of Shafir Regional Council (1952–1979).
Bootsie Neal, 68, American politician, city commissioner of Dayton, Ohio (1991–2005).
Don M. Newman, 97, American pharmacist, deputy secretary of health and human services (1985–1989).
Patrick O'Donoghue, 86, Irish Roman Catholic prelate, bishop of Lancaster (2001–2009).
Mike Omoighe, 62, Nigerian artist and educator, COVID-19.
Urszula Plenkiewicz, 99, Polish scout and liaison officer.
Ron Rafferty, 86, English footballer (Grimsby Town, Aldershot, Portsmouth).
Carl Schalk, 91, American composer.
Frank Shankwitz, 77, American philanthropist, co-founder of the Make-A-Wish Foundation, esophageal cancer.
Joseph Sonnabend, 88, South African physician and HIV/AIDS researcher (How to Have Sex in an Epidemic), complications from a heart attack.
Barbara Sullivan, 78, Canadian politician, Ontario MPP (1987–1995), cancer.
Marcel Uderzo, 87, French comic book artist, COVID-19.
Sifis Valirakis, 77, Greek politician and anti-junta activist, MP (1977–2004, 2009–2012) and minister of public order (1995–1996), drowned.
David Washbrook, 72, British historian.
Notable Brazilians who died in the 2021 Palmas FR plane crash:
Marcus Molinari, 23, footballer (Tupi, Ipatinga, Tupynambás).
Guilherme Noé, 28, footballer (Batatais, Rio Preto, Ipatinga).
Ranule, 27, footballer (Atlético Itapemirim, Democrata, Resende).

25
Ihwan Datu Adam, 56, Indonesian politician, MP (2016–2019).
Sōichi Aikawa, 78, Japanese politician, mayor of Urawa, Saitama (1991–2001) and Saitama (2001–2009), respiratory failure.
Mike Bell, 63, American motorcycle racer, heart attack.
Big Drama, 15, American racehorse, euthanized. (death announced on this date)
Chico Borja, 61, Ecuadorian-American soccer player (New York Cosmos, Wichita Wings, U.S. national team) and manager, colon cancer.
David Bright, 64, Botswanan football manager (Mogoditshane Fighters, Cape Town, national team), complications from COVID-19.
Tseng Chang, 90, Chinese-American actor (Romeo Must Die, Agent Cody Banks, 2012).
Jaoid Chiguer, 35, French Olympic boxer (2008), heart attack.
Marie Harmon, 97, American actress (The El Paso Kid, Secret Beyond the Door, I Married a Woman).
Iron, 29, South Korean rapper (Show Me the Money 3), blunt force trauma.
Masada Iosefa, 32, Samoan rugby league player (Penrith Panthers, Wests Tigers, national team), traffic collision.
David Katzenstein, 69, American virologist, COVID-19.
Pierre Lherminier, 90, French cinematic historian and writer.
Richard McCann, 71, American writer.
Avelino Méndez Rangel, 62, Mexican politician, deputy (2009–2012), COVID-19.
C. R. Parthiban, 92, Indian actor (Veerapandiya Kattabomman).
Jane Priestman, 90, British designer.
Herman Puig, 92, Cuban photographer and painter.
Jean Richard, 99, French historian.
Ron Rodecker, 90, American educator, artist and television writer (Dragon Tales), heart failure.
Dick Smith, 94, American baseball player (Pittsburgh Pirates).
Vladimír Suchánek, 87, Czech artist.
Maryan Synakowski, 84, French footballer (Sedan, Union SG, national team).
Enrique Tábara, 90, Ecuadorian painter, heart attack.
Mart Vilt, 85, Estonian middle-distance runner.
Alistair Walker, 76, Canadian-born English racing driver.

26
6 Dogs, 21, American rapper, suicide by jumping.
Georgi Ananiev, 70, Bulgarian politician, minister of defence (1997–1999), COVID-19.
Alan Ashcroft, 90, English rugby union player (Waterloo, British & Irish Lions, national team).
Harry Beal, 90, American soldier, first Navy SEAL.
Winfried Bölke, 79, German racing cyclist.
Stephen Carter, 77, American politician, member of the Louisiana House of Representatives (2008–2020), COVID-19.
Kjersti Døvigen, 77, Norwegian actress (The Last Fleksnes, Lasse & Geir, Life and Death).
Yabing Masalon Dulo, 106, Filipino textile weaver and dyer.
Berit Oskal Eira, 69, Norwegian politician, Sámi MP (since 2001).
Fred Forsberg, 76, American football player (Denver Broncos, Buffalo Bills).
Peter Forster, 86, British wood engraver and printmaker. (death announced on this date)
Virginia Fraser, 73, Australian artist.
Ken Frost, 82, American football player (Dallas Cowboys).
Margitta Gummel, 79, German shot putter, Olympic champion (1968).
James Gita Hakim, 66, South Sudanese–Ugandan cardiologist, COVID-19.
Richard Holzer, 97, Austrian-born Panamanian architect.
Val Howell, Welsh lawn bowler.
Nurul Huq, 85, Bangladeshi naval officer, chief of Naval Staff (1972–1973), complications from diabetes.
Constance Isherwood, 101, Canadian lawyer.
Ron Johnson, 64, American baseball player (Kansas City Royals, Montreal Expos) and manager (Norfolk Tides), COVID-19.
Billy Kenoi, 52, American politician, mayor of Hawaii County (2008–2016), myelofibrosis.
Norman Krivosha, 86, American lawyer and jurist, chief justice of the Nebraska Supreme Court (1978–1987).
María Teresa Linares Savio, 100, Cuban musicologist and ethnographer.
Hana Maciuchová, 75, Czech actress (Holiday for a Dog, In the Coat of Lioness' Arms, Loners).
Luc Julian Matthys, 85, Belgian-born Australian Roman Catholic prelate, bishop of Armidale (1999–2011).
Bob McCallister, 86, American golfer, PGA Tour champion (1961, 1964).
George T. McDonald, 76, American philanthropist and social worker.
Gene McDowell, 81, American football player (Florida State Seminoles) and coach (UCF Knights), leukemia.
Stephan P. Mickle, 76, American jurist, judge (since 1998) and chief judge (2009–2011) of the U.S. District Court for Northern Florida.
John Mortimore, 86, English football player (Chelsea) and manager (Benfica, Belenenses).
John Morton, 95, English trade unionist and musician, general secretary of the Musicians' Union (1971–1990) and president of the International Federation of Musicians (1973–2004).
Cindy Nemser, 83, American art historian.
Lars Norén, 76, Swedish playwright, novelist and poet, COVID-19.
Abdulkadir Orire, 87, Nigerian Islamic legal scholar.
Cara O'Sullivan, 59, Irish coloratura soprano singer.
Sergei Prikhodko, 64, Russian politician, deputy prime minister (2013–2018), complications from amyotrophic lateral sclerosis.
Sekou Smith, 48, American sportswriter and journalist (The Indianapolis Star, The Atlanta Journal-Constitution, NBA TV), COVID-19.
Margaret C. Snyder, 91, American social scientist and feminist, founder of the United Nations Development Fund for Women, cardiac arrest.
Ben Te Haara, 88, New Zealand Anglican prelate, bishop of Te Pīhopatanga o Te Tai Tokerau (1992–2001).
Peter Thorburn, 81, New Zealand rugby union player (Auckland) and coach (North Harbour, U.S. national team).
Carlos Holmes Trujillo, 69, Colombian politician and diplomat, minister of the interior (1997–1998), foreign affairs (2018–2019) and defense (since 2019), COVID-19.
Jozef Vengloš, 84, Slovak football player (Slovan Bratislava) and manager (Celtic, Czechoslovakia national team).
Peter Vere-Jones, 81, British-born New Zealand actor (The Hobbit: The Desolation of Smaug, Shortland Street, Xena: Warrior Princess).

27
Flavio Alfaro, 59, American baseball player, Olympic silver medalist (1984), pancreatic cancer.
Sidney Alford, 86, British explosives engineer and inventor, heart failure.
Bertulfo Álvarez, 69–70, Colombian guerrilla fighter (Caribbean Bloc of the FARC-EP).
Ansif Ashraf, 37, Indian magazine editor (Cochin Herald), COVID-19.
Gert Blomé, 86, Swedish ice hockey player, Olympic silver medallist (1964).
Blas Camacho, 81, Spanish lawyer and politician, deputy (1977–1982, 1986–1993), COVID-19.
Yvonne Conolly, 81, Jamaican-born British educator, myeloma.
José Cruz, 68, Honduran footballer (Motagua, Real España, national team), COVID-19.
Anne Daubenspeck-Focke, 98, German sculptor and painter.
Héctor Fix-Zamudio, 96, Mexican jurist, judge of the Inter-American Court of Human Rights (1987–1997).
Freddy, 8, English Great Dane, world's tallest dog.
Dick Gallup, 79, American poet.
Guy Emmanuel Alain Gauze, 68, Ivorian politician and diplomat, ambassador to the European Union (2000–2002).
Goddess Bunny, 61, American drag queen and actress (Hollywood Vice Squad, The Goddess Bunny, Rage), COVID-19.
Godfrey Hodgson, 86, British journalist and historian.
Margareta Jacobsson, 91, Swedish Olympic alpine skier (1952).
Helga Klein, 89, German Olympic sprinter (1952).
Cloris Leachman, 94, American Hall of Fame actress (The Mary Tyler Moore Show, The Last Picture Show, Young Frankenstein), Oscar winner (1971), stroke and COVID-19.
Corky Lee, 73, American photojournalist, complications from COVID-19.
Saini Lemamea, 56, Samoan rugby union player (national team). (death announced on this date)
Wendel Meldrum, 66, Canadian actress (The Wonder Years, Less Than Kind, Seinfeld).
Mehrdad Minavand, 45, Iranian football player (Pas, Persepolis, national team) and manager, COVID-19.
Phillida Nicholson, 96, British artist. (death announced on this date)
Tim Owhefere, 57, Nigerian politician, Delta State MHA (since 2007).
Aminuddin Ponulele, 81, Indonesian academician and politician, governor of Central Sulawesi (2001–2006).
Antoni Puigdellívol, 74, Andorran politician, mayor of Andorra la Vella (1978–1979), MP (1982–1985), and minister of tourism and environment (2005–2007).
Tiina Rinne, 91, Finnish actress (Kotikatu).
Efraín Ruales, 36, Ecuadorian actor, musician, and TV presenter, shot.
Trung Kiên, 81, Vietnamese classical singer.
Carmen Vázquez, 72, American LGBT activist and writer, complications from COVID-19.

28
Wismoyo Arismunandar, 80, Indonesian military officer, chief of staff of the Army (1993–1995).
Chedly Ayari, 87, Tunisian economist and politician, minister of education (1970–1971) and finance (1972–1974), president of the Central Bank (2012–2018), COVID-19.
Mangal Bagh, 47–48, Pakistani militant, leader of Lashkar-e-Islam (since 2006), mine explosion.
Lida Barrett, 93, American mathematician.
John L. Behan, 76, American politician, member of the New York State Assembly (1979–1995).
Rod Boll, 68, Canadian Olympic sports shooter (1996).
Ron Botchan, 85, American football player (Los Angeles Chargers, Houston Oilers) and umpire (National Football League).
Leslie Brown, 84, English footballer (Dulwich Hamlet).
Adrián Campos, 60, Spanish racing driver (Formula One) and team owner (Campos Racing).
Miguel Celdrán, 80, Spanish politician, senator (2000, 2004–2007) and mayor of Badajoz (1995–2013).
Eddie Connachan, 85, Scottish footballer (Dunfermline Athletic, Middlesbrough, national team).
Paul J. Crutzen, 87, Dutch atmospheric chemist, Nobel laureate (1995).
Cédric Demangeot, 46, French poet.
Yvon Douis, 85, French footballer (Lille, AS Monaco, national team), COVID-19.
Jean Dubois, 94, Belgian Olympic field hockey player (1948, 1952, 1956, 1960).
Guillermo Galeote, 79, Spanish doctor and politician, deputy (1977–1993), COVID-19.
Kathleen Ann Goonan, 68, American science fiction author, bone cancer.
John Grant, 89, Scottish footballer (Hibernian, national team).
Morton Ira Greenberg, 87, American jurist, judge of the U.S. Court of Appeals for the Third Circuit (since 1987).
Shaibal Gupta, 67, Indian social scientist, multiple organ failure.
Rafael Heredia, 84, Mexican Olympic basketball player (1964, 1968).
Bjarne Holen, 95, Norwegian politician, deputy MP (1965–1973).
Gil Imaná, 87, Bolivian muralist and painter.
César Isella, 82, Argentine singer-songwriter (Los Fronterizos), coronary disease.
Abu Yasser al-Issawi, 43, Iraqi Islamic militant (Islamic State), military strike.
Dominic Jeeva, 93, Sri Lankan author.
Mangalamkunnu Karnan, 60–63, Indian elephant, cardiac arrest.
Ryszard Kotys, 88, Polish actor (Operacja Himmler, Shivers, Świat według Kiepskich), COVID-19.
Sibongile Khumalo, 63, South African singer.
Annette Kullenberg, 82, Swedish journalist (Aftonbladet) and author, COVID-19.
Vasily Lanovoy, 87, Russian actor (Colleagues, Going Inside a Storm, Officers), People's Artist of the USSR (1985), complications of COVID-19.
Christopher Lewis, 76, American filmmaker (Blood Cult), heart disease.
Juan del Río Martín, 73, Spanish Roman Catholic prelate, military archbishop of Spain (since 2008) and bishop of Asidonia-Jerez (2000–2008), COVID-19.
Alberto Matos, 76, Portuguese Olympic sprinter (1972).
Kenneth Mthiyane, 76, South African jurist, deputy president of the Supreme Court of Appeal (2012–2014), COVID-19.
Rafael Navarro-Gonzalez, 61, Mexican astrobiologist, COVID-19.
Walter Plywaski, 91, Polish-born American Holocaust survivor and lecturer, complications from COVID-19.
Alice Recoque, 91, French computer scientist.
Sherman Robertson, 72, American blues musician.
Krishan Dev Sethi, 93, Indian politician and independence activist, member of the Constituent Assembly of Jammu and Kashmir (1951–1957).
Singing Sandra, 64, Trinidadian calypso singer.
Bachir Skiredj, 81, Moroccan actor (In Search of My Wife's Husband), COVID-19.
Aidan Sprot, 102, British army officer.
Cicely Tyson, 96, American Hall of Fame actress (Sounder, The Autobiography of Miss Jane Pittman, The Trip to Bountiful), Tony winner (2013).
Wang Shouguan, 98, Chinese astronomer, delegate to the National People's Congress (1978–1998) and member of the Chinese Academy of Sciences.
Jeffrey Watson, 81, British priest, archdeacon of Ely (1993–2004).
Heidi Weisel, 59, American fashion designer.
Lewis Wolpert, 91, South African-born British developmental biologist, COVID-19.
Valerie Yule, 92, Australian child psychologist.

29
Ahmed Achour, 75, Tunisian composer and conductor.
Emilia Asim-Ita, 33, Nigerian entrepreneur, co-founder of The Future Awards Africa.
Beatriz Barba, 92, Mexican archaeologist, member of the Mexican Academy of Sciences.
Bunki Bankaitis-Davis, 63, American Olympic cyclist (1988), world champion (1992), cancer.
Walker Boone, 76, Canadian actor (The Adventures of Super Mario Bros. 3, Super Mario World).
Dick Callahan, 80, American public address announcer (Oakland Athletics, Golden State Warriors, California Golden Bears football).
John Chaney, 89, American Hall of Fame basketball coach (Cheyney State Wolves, Temple Owls).
Cy Chermak, 91, American television producer (CHiPs, Ironside, Kolchak: The Night Stalker).
Michael Clanchy, 84, British medieval historian, stroke.
Calane da Silva, 75, Mozambican writer and journalist, COVID-19.
Christian Daigle, 42, Canadian ice hockey agent.
Art Davis, 86, American football player (Pittsburgh Steelers), Parkinson's disease.
Donald J. Delandro, 85, American brigadier general.
Richard L. Feigen, 90, American art gallery owner, complications from COVID-19.
Roberto Frojuello, 83, Brazilian footballer (São Paulo, River Plate, Colo-Colo).
Grady Gaines, 86, American blues saxophonist.
Robert Heuberger, 99, Swiss businessman.
Flory Jagoda, 97, Bosnian-born American musician and songwriter.
Arvind Joshi, 84, Indian actor (Sholay, Love Marriage, Ab To Aaja Saajan Mere).
José Júlio, 85, Portuguese bullfighter, COVID-19.
Maurice Kleman, 86, French physicist.
Otto Dov Kulka, 88, Israeli historian.
John E. Kutzbach, 83, American climate scientist.
Lai Xiaomin, 58, Chinese economist and convicted embezzler, chairman of China Huarong Asset Management (2012–2018), execution.
Jeremy Lubbock, 89, English pianist and Grammy-winning arranger ("Hard Habit to Break", "When I Fall in Love").
Mary Anne Marchino, 83, American Olympic swimmer (1956).
Alberto Neuman, 87, Argentine classical pianist.
Reinaldo Paniagua Diez, 86, Puerto Rican politician, secretary of state (1977–1979) and senator (1985–1989).
Didier Pasgrimaud, 54, French Olympic cyclist (1988).
Joe Pat Prunty, 88, Northern Irish Gaelic footballer (Roslea Shamrocks).
Merritt Ruhlen, 76, American linguist.
Steve Stephens, 90, American personal relations practitioner and presenter.
Tochinoumi Teruyoshi, 82, Japanese sumo wrestler, aspiration pneumonia.
Jacqueline Thévoz, 94, Swiss writer, poet and journalist.
Percy Tucker, 92, South African author and ticket selling agent, COVID-19.
Varol Ürkmez, 84, Turkish footballer (Beşiktaş, Altay, national team).
Hilton Valentine, 77, English Hall of Fame guitarist (The Animals).

30
Jay Blumler, 96, American-British theorist of communication and media.
Allan Burns, 85, American television producer and screenwriter (The Munsters, The Mary Tyler Moore Show, Rhoda), Emmy winner (1968, 1971, 1977).
Helene S. Coleman, 95, American religious activist, president of the National Council of Jewish Women.
Chad Colley, 76, American para-alpine skier, army officer, and disability advocate, Paralympic champion (1992).
József Csatári, 77, Hungarian wrestler, Olympic bronze medalist (1968, 1972).
Nisa Donnelly, 70, American novelist.
Double K, 43, American rapper (People Under the Stairs).
Rafael Gallardo García, 93, Mexican Roman Catholic prelate, bishop of Linares (1974–1987) and Tampico (1987–2003).
Bill Hammond, 74, New Zealand artist.
Bernice Falk Haydu, 100, American aviator.
Mick Kerr, 86, Northern Irish Gaelic footballer (Tyrone).
Abbas Khan, 66, Pakistani squash player, complications from COVID-19.
Wilhelm Knabe, 97, German ecologist and politician, MP (1987–1990), COVID-19.
Rosalyn Koo, 94, Chinese-born American businesswoman and philanthropist.
Michel Le Bris, 76, French writer.
Alfreda Markowska, 94, Polish Holocaust survivor and philanthropist.
Eugenio Martínez, 98, Cuban-born American operative (CIA, Brigade 2506) and convicted criminal (Watergate burglary).
Edward Stourton, 27th Baron Mowbray, 67, English peer, fall.
Neelo, 80, Pakistani actress (Bhowani Junction, Do Raste, Ghunghat).
Pantelei Sandulache, 64, Moldovan politician, MP (1990–1994).
Turki bin Nasser Al Saud, 72, Saudi prince and military officer.
Sophie, 34, Scottish singer-songwriter ("Bipp", "Lemonade") and record producer, accidental fall.
Robert Stevens, 87, British lawyer and academic.
Nelly Toll, 88, Polish-born American artist, writer, and Holocaust survivor, cardiac arrhythmia and pulmonary embolism.
Michel Trempont, 92, Belgian opera singer.
Marc Wilmore, 57, American comedian and screenwriter (In Living Color, The Simpsons, F Is for Family), Emmy winner (2008), COVID-19.
Alla Yoshpe, 83, Russian pop singer, People's Artist of the Russian Federation (2002).

31
Zoila Águila Almeida, 82, Cuban revolutionary combatant, COVID-19.
Mark Beard, 72, American racing driver and team owner (Beard Motorsports).
Douglas Bravo, 88, Venezuelan guerrilla fighter (FALN), COVID-19.
Philip Favel, 98, Canadian indigenous activist.
Peter T. Fay, 92, American jurist, judge of the S.D. Fla. (1970–1976) and judge of the U.S. Courts of Appeals for the Fifth (1976–1981) and Eleventh (since 1981) Circuits.
Benedict J. Fernandez, 84, American educator and photojournalist.
Terrence L. Fine, 81, American scientist and philosopher.
John Gibbons, 95, English footballer (QPR, Ipswich Town, Tottenham Hotspur), COVID-19.
Alejandro Gómez, 53, Spanish Olympic long-distance runner (1996), brain tumor.
Nate Hawkins, 70, American football player (Houston Oilers), COVID-19.
Andrej Hryc, 71, Slovak actor (Rivers of Babylon, Habermann, Colette), leukemia.
Ilahi Jamadar, 74, Indian Marathi ghazal poet.
Andrzej Kossakowski, 82, Polish theoretical physicist.
Abdul Hamid Mahmud, 79, Indonesian military officer and politician, regent of Malang (1985–1995) and vice-governor of East Java (1995–2000).
Tozama Mantashe, 60, South African politician, MP (since 2014), complications from COVID-19.
Lothar Meister, 90, German racing cyclist.
Wambali Mkandawire, 68, Malawian jazz singer, COVID-19.
Michel Murr, 88, Lebanese construction executive and politician, MP (1968–1972, since 1992), minister of national defense (1990–1992) and interior (1994–2000), COVID-19.
Elizabeth Muyovwe, 64, Zambian jurist, judge of the Supreme Court (since 2010), COVID-19.
Michael O'Keefe, 89, American politician, member (1960–1983) and  president (1976–1983) of the Louisiana State Senate, cancer.
Mihail Popescu, 60, Romanian Olympic ice hockey player (1980).
David Rose, 89, Scottish rugby union (Jed-Forest RFC, national team) and rugby league (Leeds) player.
Martial Rose, 98, English educator and historian.
Herman Prins Salomon, 91, Dutch translator and academic.
Pierre-Paul Savoie, 66, Canadian choreographer and dancer, cancer.
Yitzchok Scheiner, 98, American-born Israeli Haredi rabbi, COVID-19.
Meshulam Dovid Soloveitchik, 99, Polish-born Israeli Haredi rabbi, rosh yeshiva of the Brisk yeshiva (since 1959), complications from COVID-19.
John M Squire, 75, British biophysicist, COVID-19.
Ladislav Štaidl, 75, Czech composer and musician, Medal of Merit recipient, complications from COVID-19.
Justo Tejada, 88, Spanish footballer (Barcelona, Real Madrid, national team).
Miroslav Tuđman, 74, Croatian scientist and politician, MP (since 2011), COVID-19.
Abraham J. Twerski, 90, American-born Israeli Hasidic rabbi and psychiatrist, COVID-19.
Oliver Welden, 74, Chilean poet.
Victor Ziga, 75, Filipino politician, senator (1987–1992), multiple organ failure.

References

2021-01
 01